= Cementoma =

Odontogenic tumor of cementum

- Specialty: Dentistry

Human Tooth Diagram

Cementoma is an odontogenic tumor of cementum. It is usually observed as a benign spherical mass of hard tissue fused to the root of a tooth. It is found most commonly in the mandible in the region of the lower molar teeth, occurring between the ages of 8 and 30 in both sexes with equal frequency . It causes distortion of surrounding areas but is usually a painless growth, at least initially. Considerable thickening of the cementum can often be observed. A periapical form is also recognized. Cementoma is not exclusive to the mandible as it can infrequently occur in the maxilla and other parts of the body such as the long bones.

== Signs & Symptoms ==
Cementoma is characterized by a significant amount of thickening of the cementum around the roots of the teeth. The main teeth involved can include deciduous and permanent teeth, impacted molars and premolars. The growth is typically benign and painless. Although symptoms may not be noticeable, a dull pain and dentin hypersensitivity can occur as growth increases. Visibility of the cementoma may increase with growth and cause distortion/swelling to the face and surrounding areas along with tooth displacement. Histological analyses reveal several sheets of cementum that show evidence of both cementoblast and cementoclast activity.

=== Complications ===
The following complications may occur as a result of growth and expansion in the cementum:

- Bleeding
- Nerve damage
- Malocclusion

== Causes ==
The exact cause of cementomas is still widely unknown. It is understood that cells of the cementum found at the apex of a tooth root in rare cases grow uncontrollably. Cementomas are derived from ectomesenchyme of odontogenic origin. Complications of cementogenesis and proliferation of cementoblasts can be implicated; however, cementomas have only been linked to and theorized to be caused by: trauma, reaction to local irritation, infection, endocrine imbalance, cell proliferation and vitamin deficiency.

== Pathophysiology ==
Cementomas develop as cells that generate cementum, or cementoblasts uncontrollably proliferate at the apex of a tooth root. Cementoblasts that form the cementum typically cease activity and become cementocytes. However, a layer of cementoblasts lies on the outer layer of the periodontal ligament, in which these cells will resume cementogenic activity upon injury to a tooth. Excessive production of cementum will result in destruction of the periodontal ligament and mandible.

Researchers of a 2017 and 2018 case study, have determined pathogenesis to occurs in three stages. The first stage involves periapical osteolysis which is characterized by a noncalcified matrix and formation of a circular radiolucent area near the apex of the affected tooth. The second stage is characterized by active cementoblasts that create radiopaque matter in the center of the lesion. The final stage is characterized by maturation and calcification of the entire lesion in which it is completely radiopaque and surrounded by a radiolucent rim.

== Diagnosis ==
A cementoma may present itself on a radiograph or x-ray and appear as an radiopaque mass depending on its stage and mass within the lower dental arch. In early stages, the mass will appear as radiolucent. In terminal stages, the mass becomes radiopaque and a radiolucent rim will be visible. As the lesion enlarges, complexity of diagnosis increases and the mass must be analyzed for characteristics of an odontoma, hypercementosis, cemental dysplasia, and condensing osteitis. Misdiagnosis can result in an unnecessary root canal.

=== Differential diagnosis ===
- Cementomas reveal a more uniform radiolucent band surrounding the lesion than the bands found in cement dysplasia.
- Periapical cemental dysplasia is usually found in the lower anterior teeth and does not cause shifting of teeth.
- Odontomas have mixed radio density and usually are not continuous into the root.
- Hypercementosis present with small lesions and are not accompanied by pain or jaw swelling.
- Condensing osteitis is a well-defined radiopaque lesion usually surrounding the apex of a necrotic tooth and does not have a radiolucent rim.

== Prevention/Treatment ==
There are currently no preventative measures available for cementomas. Treatment of a cementoma involves surgically removing the mass and possibly a portion of the affected area and/or teeth. Surgical removal without damage to surrounding teeth is limited unless the lesion is small and if there is a sufficient crown-to-root ratio. Although benign, a cementoma will continue to grow in size if left untreated. Growth will also greatly affect the function of the teeth. If growth and affected teeth are not completely removed, the risk of reoccurrence increases.

== Prognosis ==
No malignant form of this conditions exists and rarely will the mass reappear. Individuals can expect full recovery from this condition with the proper treatment and removal of affected area. Although recurrence of cementomas is extremely rare, post-surgical and long-term follow ups are recommended.

== Epidemiology ==
Cementoma represent less than one percent of odontogenic tumors. Women and men between their 20s and 30s are most likely to develop a cementoma, with males being slightly more affected than females. Of all cases reported, fifty percent of the patients were under 20 years of age and seventy-five percent were younger than 30 years of age. Occurrence is also seen in both children and older adults. The type of cementoma varies by demographic category.

== Research Directions ==
There is a lack of both information and recent research on cementomas. There are multiple individual case studies available on the different types of cementomas, however no clinical trials for treatment of this condition have been executed. A 2018 case report detailed an unusual reoccurrence in a 4.5-year-old boy. The young child was referred to the Oral and Maxillofacial Surgery Department of Tehran University of Medical Sciences and upon examination, they found a well-defined radiopaque mass in the apical region of his right deciduous mandibular second molar. The patient presented with swelling and mild pain, but no difficulty with speech, breathing or swallowing. The first lesion was removed, but at age 5.5, post-surgical follow-ups revealed a new lesion accompanied by mild swelling. This lesion as well as a lesion that appeared at 8 years of age were determined to be a benign cementoma. Each lesion was removed and the boy showed evidence of no further reoccurrence after three post-surgery follow-ups.

== Types ==
Four types of cementomas are described:

- Benign cementoblastoma
- Periapical cemental dysplasia
- Multiple apical cementomas
- Gigantiform cementoma

== See also ==
- Gigantiform cementoma
