= Crown-to-root ratio =

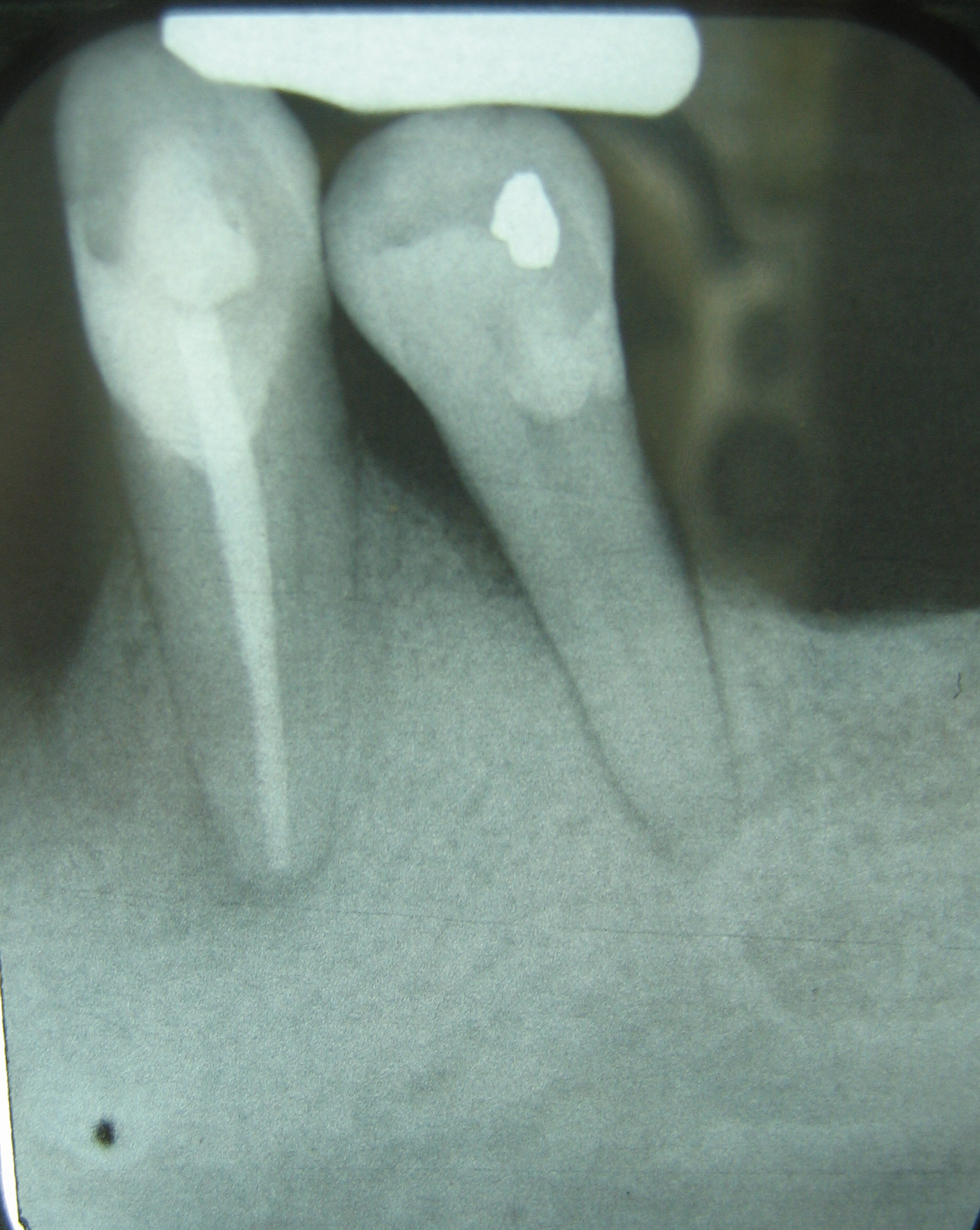
This X-ray film reveals a poor crown-to-root ratio for tooth #21 (right), the lower left first premolar. The tooth exhibits 50% bone loss, adding roughly 5-7 mm to the clinical crown of what is actually anatomical root. The fulcrum, existing somewhere immediately apical to the height of the bone, does not allow for any adjacent bone to avoid compression or tension, resulting in virtually complete widening of the PDL and a grim prognosis, due to secondary occlusal trauma.

Crown-to-root-ratio is the ratio of the length of the part of a tooth that appears above the alveolar bone versus what lies below it. It is an important consideration in the diagnosis, treatment planning and restoration of teeth, one that hopefully guides the plan of treatment to the proper end result.

== Perspectives of different terminologies ==
=== Anatomical terms ===
All teeth have two general sections, the crown and the root. Because the crown is covered with enamel and the root is covered with cementum, the line at which these two sections join is called the cementoenamel junction. In health, the roots of teeth are entirely surrounded by and submerged in the alveolar bone of either the maxilla or the mandible, depending on whether the tooth in question is an upper or a lower tooth, up until the cementoenamel junction. Overlying the bone is the gingival soft tissue, which is, on average, about 1 millimeter in thickness. Because of this gingiva, the crown, which exists entirely outside of the surrounding bone, is somewhat obscured at the apical millimeter or so. Thus, crown and root can be used as anatomical terms, defining the actual parts of a tooth. Gingival recession is a related condition to decreased crown-to-root ratio, but referring to gingiva.

=== Clinical terms ===
These terms can also be used to refer to the clinical sense of the words, as relative crown and relative root, by describing how much tooth remains surrounded by bone. As the inflammation associated with periodontal disease causes the bone to resorb and disappear, revealing more of the root structure, the effective crown height in relation to the effective root height is reduced and the prognosis shifts from favorable to unfavorable.

== Clinical importance ==
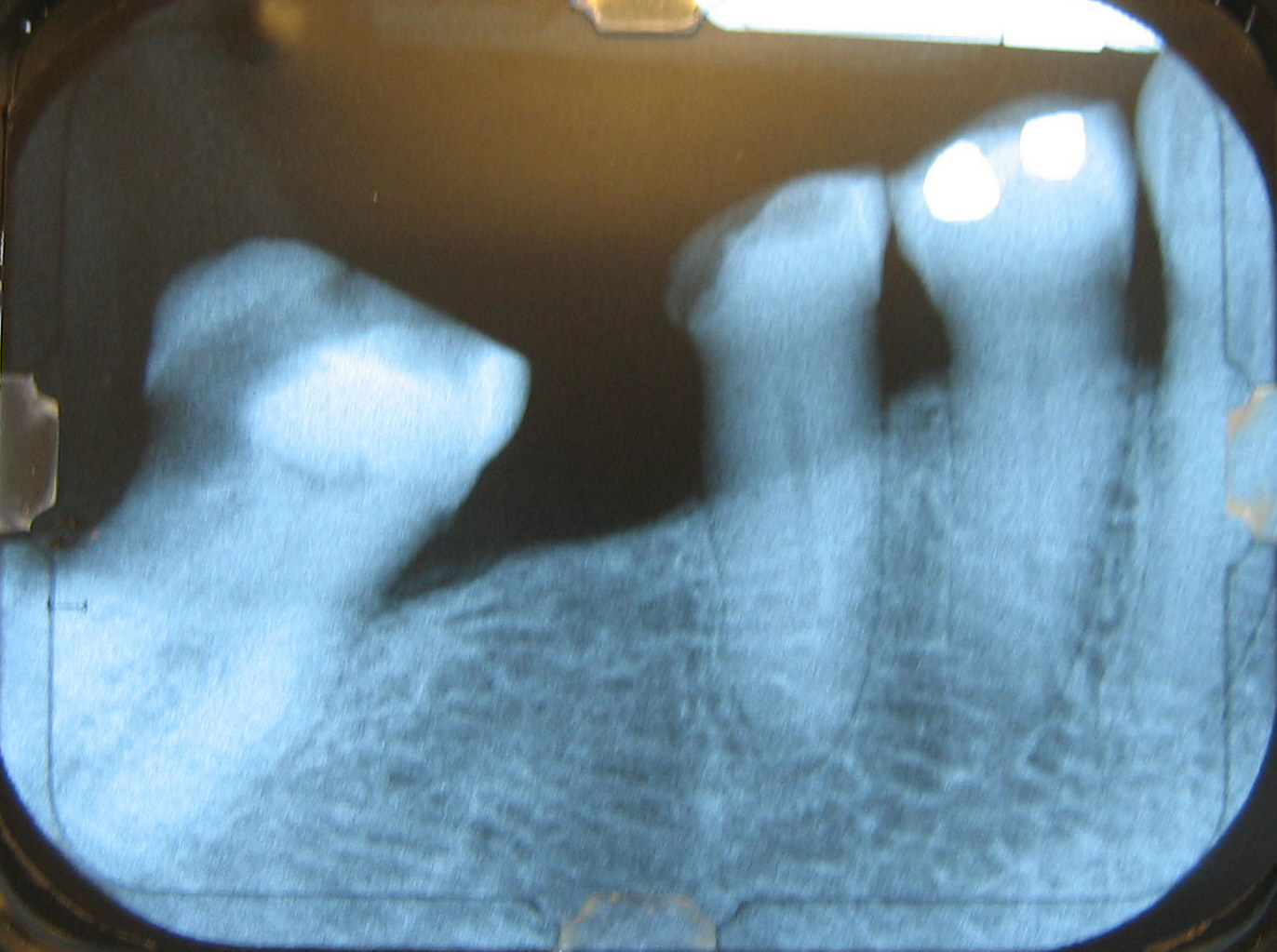
This X-ray film displays horizontal bone loss of the mandible, in the lower right quadrant. Although the two premolars and the molar exhibit moderate to severe bone loss, there was no tooth mobility at the time this film was taken.

Clinically, the anatomical definitions don't really matter; what is important in terms of support for the teeth within the bone is how much of the teeth remain embedded; this is where the crown-to-root ratio becomes important.

Naturally, the cementoenamel junction exists much closer to the incisal or occlusal surface of a tooth than to the tip of the root or roots. Because of this fact, root length is considerably longer than crown length, and this helps allow for proper support of the teeth during normal function, not unlike a tree that has a root system hidden below ground which is more often than not considerably larger and more elaborate than the form taken by the growing branches. If a towering tree doesn't have enough support provided by its root system, it will easily be knocked over in even a slight wind; similarly, a tooth requires a sturdy root system encased in bone to protect it from being knocked out of the mouth.

The natural crown-to-root ratio is thus termed a favorable crown-to-root ratio, because the root system existing within the surrounding bone is more than sufficient to support the tooth under normal physiologic stresses. After some bone loss is incurred, though, and more root structure is visible outside of the supporting bone, not only is there less effective root support, but there is an increased height of revealed tooth structure that this now diminished submerged root is responsible for supporting. In a way, then, each millimeter of lost bone contributes, for example, to a millimeter of less support and a millimeter of more structure to support. As can be extrapolated, this can easily become a very serious problem once three, four or five millimeters of bone have been lost due to periodontal disease. The minimum crown-to-root ratio necessary is 1:1; any less support provided by the roots drastically reduces the prognosis of the tooth and its restoration.

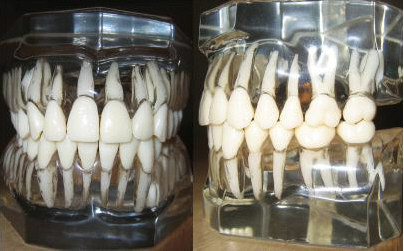
Models of human teeth as they exist within the alveolar bone. The roots, as they can be seen through the transparent "bone", exist naturally in greater inciso-apical lengths than the crowns.

Teeth are constantly subject to both horizontal and vertical occlusal forces. With the center of rotation of the tooth acting as a fulcrum, the surface of bone adjacent to the pressured side of the tooth will undergo resorption and disappear, while the surface of bone adjacent to the tensioned side of the tooth will undergo apposition and increase in volume. When the amount of root remaining in the bone is so short that the entire surface of bone adjacent to the root surface is constantly under compression or tension (with no middle section acting as a stabilizer for the fulcrum), the prognosis for the tooth is deemed highly unfavorable. This is usually the outcome associated with untreated secondary occlusal trauma.

== See also ==
- Crown lengthening
- Post and core
