= Lamina dura =

Compact bone within the tooth socket

Lamina dura is compact bone that lies adjacent to the periodontal ligament, in the tooth socket.

The lamina dura is a specialised component of the alveolar bone proper, characterized by thin, dense bone lamellae (cortical bone) that surrounds the tooth root. On an x-ray, a lamina dura will appear as a distinct radiopaque line surrounding the tooth root. Its structure contains numerous perforations that house blood vessels, lymphatics, and nerves, earning it the alternative name "cribriform plate". The lamina dura surrounds the tooth socket (at the tooth root), and provides the attachment surface with which the Sharpey's fibers (collagen fibers) of the periodontal ligament perforate and insert into, which is why it is also referred to as "bundle bone".

Under the lamina dura is the less bright cancellous bone, due to its mineral composition. Trabeculae are the tiny spicules of bone crisscrossing the cancellous bone that make it look spongy. These trabeculae separate the cancellous bone into tiny compartments which contain the blood-producing marrow.

Anatomically, the lamina dura transitions smoothly from the alveolar crest into the cancellous bone within the alveolar process. It is situated adjacent to three important structures: the periodontal ligament, the cementum (a mineralized tissue that provides attachment for the periodontal ligament), and the alveolar bone. Removal of the lamina dura may not be noticeable by a dentist unless the trabecular bone is also removed. An intact lamina dura is seen as a sign of healthy periodontium.This arrangement creates an integrated system that supports and maintains tooth position and function, in which it plays an important role in bone remodeling and thus in orthodontic tooth movement (along with periodontal ligament).

== Clinical significance ==
The lamina dura serves an essential role in tooth stabilization by connecting the periodontal ligament to the alveolar bone and providing mechanical stability during mastication, which prevents tooth displacement and maintains proper occlusion. Through its cellular components (osteoblasts, osteoclasts, and osteocytes), it actively participates in bone remodeling in response to mechanical stresses from activities like chewing. The integration of Sharpey's fibers from the periodontal ligament to the lamina dura enables controlled tooth movement while maintaining stability. Given its integral relationship with periodontal health, the appearance of the lamina dura serves as a clinical indicator for various periodontal conditions and diseases.

== Radiological appearance ==
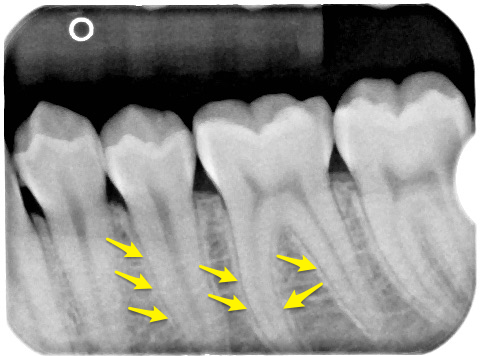
Lamina Dura

The lamina dura is a dense bone structure visible on dental radiographs as a thin, radiopaque border adjacent to the periodontal ligament and alveolar crest, forming part of the tooth socket. Its role as "bundle bone" stems from its dense composition containing Sharpey's fibers, which develops during tooth formation as an egg-shell-like envelope and persists after eruption as a radiopaque layer. Rather than being a radiographic artifact, studies confirm its appearance is determined by both structural properties and X-ray beam direction. Several factors influence its radiographic visibility, including tooth position, root number, condition of the periodontal ligament, X-ray beam angulation, anatomical structure superimposition, and film exposure times. These variables can cause irregular appearances or apparent discontinuity, particularly in maxillary molars and premolars. Proper X-ray angulation, allowing rays to pass tangentially through the structure, enhances its visibility, while improper alignment or altered anatomy can obscure its appearance.

== Role of lamina dura in diagnosing diseases ==
The lamina dura serves as a radiographic indicator for both systemic and local pathologies. In systemic conditions, notable changes include:

1. Hyperparathyroidism (physiological or pathological)
  - Most common systemic cause of lamina dura changes
  - Results in thinning or obliteration due to cortical bone resorption
2. Renal Osteodystrophy
  - Compromised renal function leads to increased phosphate and decreased calcium
  - Reduced calcitriol production affects calcium absorption
  - Results in lamina dura reduction
3. Pregnancy
  - Causes gestational (physiological) hyperparathyroidism
  - Can show slight to complete lamina dura resorption

Local conditions affecting the lamina dura include:

1. Occlusal trauma
  - Results in lamina dura thickening due to cortical bone deposition
  - Adaptive response to excessive forces
2. Medication-related changes
  - Bisphosphonate therapy can cause thickening due to MRONJ
3. Pathological conditions:
  - Osteosarcoma can obliterate lamina dura through osteolytic activity
  - Guillain-Barre Syndrome with cytomegalovirus infections can lead to loss of lamina dura
  - Periapical lesions cause interruption or absence of lamina dura
  - Periodontal disease results in thinning or indistinct appearance

The lamina dura's appearance can be influenced by various factors including tooth position, X-ray angulation, and anatomical structures, making it an unreliable sole indicator for systemic conditions like osteoporosis and endocrine disorders.

== Research ==
Research continues to expand the understanding of the lamina dura's significance in dental health. Studies have revealed age-related changes in the lamina dura, with research on impacted third molars demonstrating significant differences in visibility and continuity between age groups. This age-related deterioration is attributed to decreased bone remodeling capacity and increased potential for bone resorption, though other factors such as enamel proximity and mechanical stimuli also play important roles in the bone remodeling process. Advanced imaging techniques, particularly CBCT, have enhanced our ability to evaluate the lamina dura as a periodontal health indicator. These radiographic analyses have shown that thinning, discontinuity, or complete loss of lamina dura correlates with periodontal inflammation, periodontal ligament damage, and alveolar bone resorption, ultimately affecting periodontal stability. Additionally, research has established significant connections between lamina dura changes and systemic conditions such as osteoporosis, hyperparathyroidism, and diabetes mellitus, with multiple studies confirming these systemic diseases' role in lamina dura deterioration through their respective pathogenic mechanisms.

== See also ==
- Alveolar bone
