= Tooth resorption =

Breakdown of the tooth root to be absorbed by the blood

Root resorption
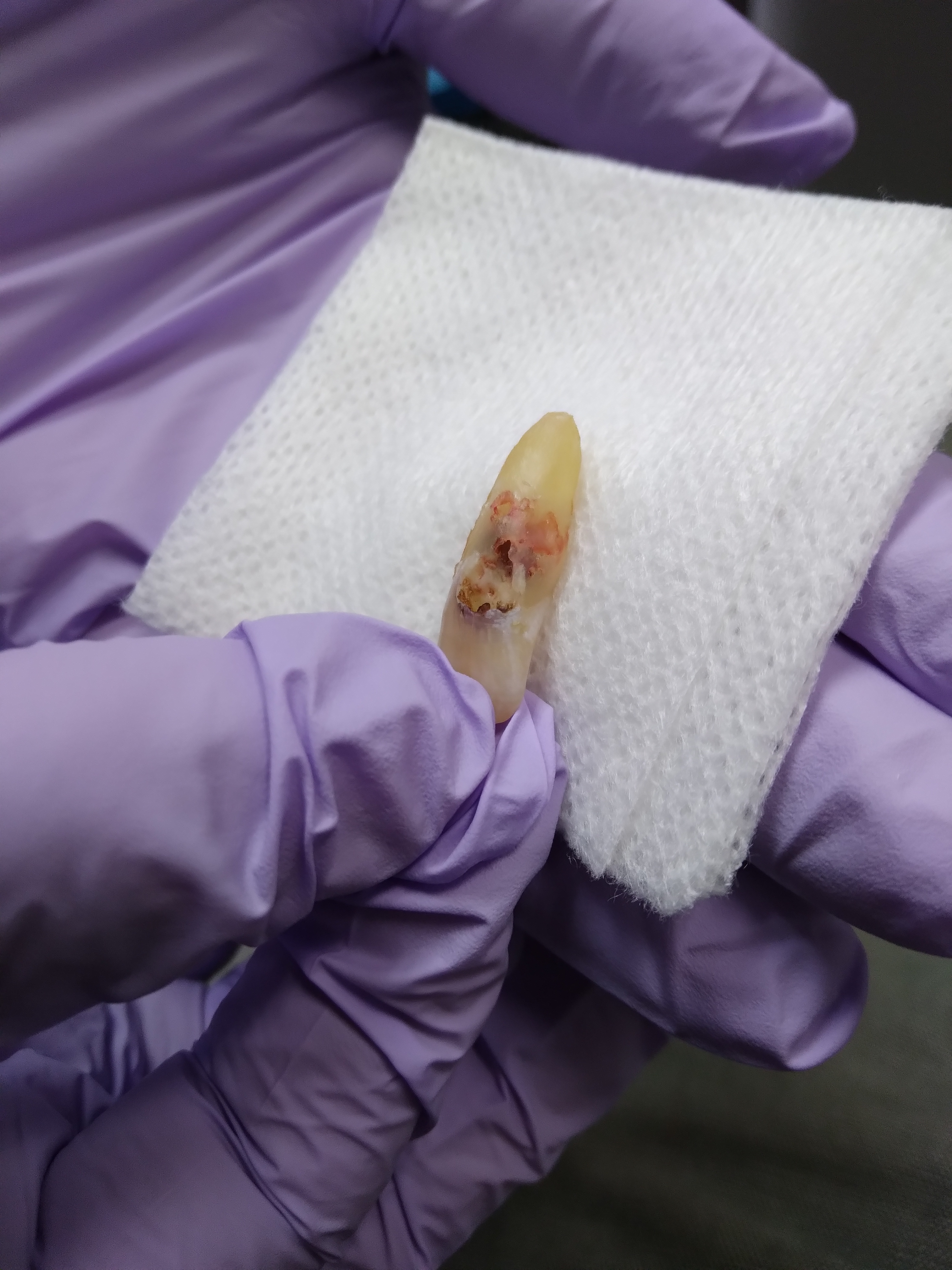
- Post traumatic External tooth resorption 9
- Specialty: Dentistry
- Symptoms: Dark tooth discoloration, swollen gums, chip tooth
- Complications: Tooth loss, infection
- Types: External (most common), internal
- Causes: Trauma, idiopathic
- Risk factors: Trauma, orthodontics
- Diagnostic method: Dental examination, X-rays
- Treatment: Dental crowns, tooth extraction, gum surgery

Root resorption is resorption of the tooth, in which there is progressive loss of dentin and cementum by the action of odontoclasts—a tooth-related osteoblast. Root resorption is a normal physiological process that occurs in the exfoliation of the primary dentition. However, pathological root resorption occurs in the permanent or secondary dentition and sometimes in the primary dentition.

== Causes ==
While resorption of bone is a normal physiological response to stimuli throughout the body, root resorption in permanent dentition and sometimes in the primary dentition is pathological. The root is protected internally (endodontium) by pre-dentin and externally on the root surface by cementum and the periodontal ligament. Chronic stimuli that damage these protective layers expose underlying dentin to the action of osteoclasts.

Root resorption most commonly occurs due to inflammation caused by pulp necrosis, trauma, periodontal treatment, orthodontic tooth movement and tooth whitening. Less common causes include pressure from malpositioned ectopic teeth, cysts, and tumors.

== Pathophysiology ==
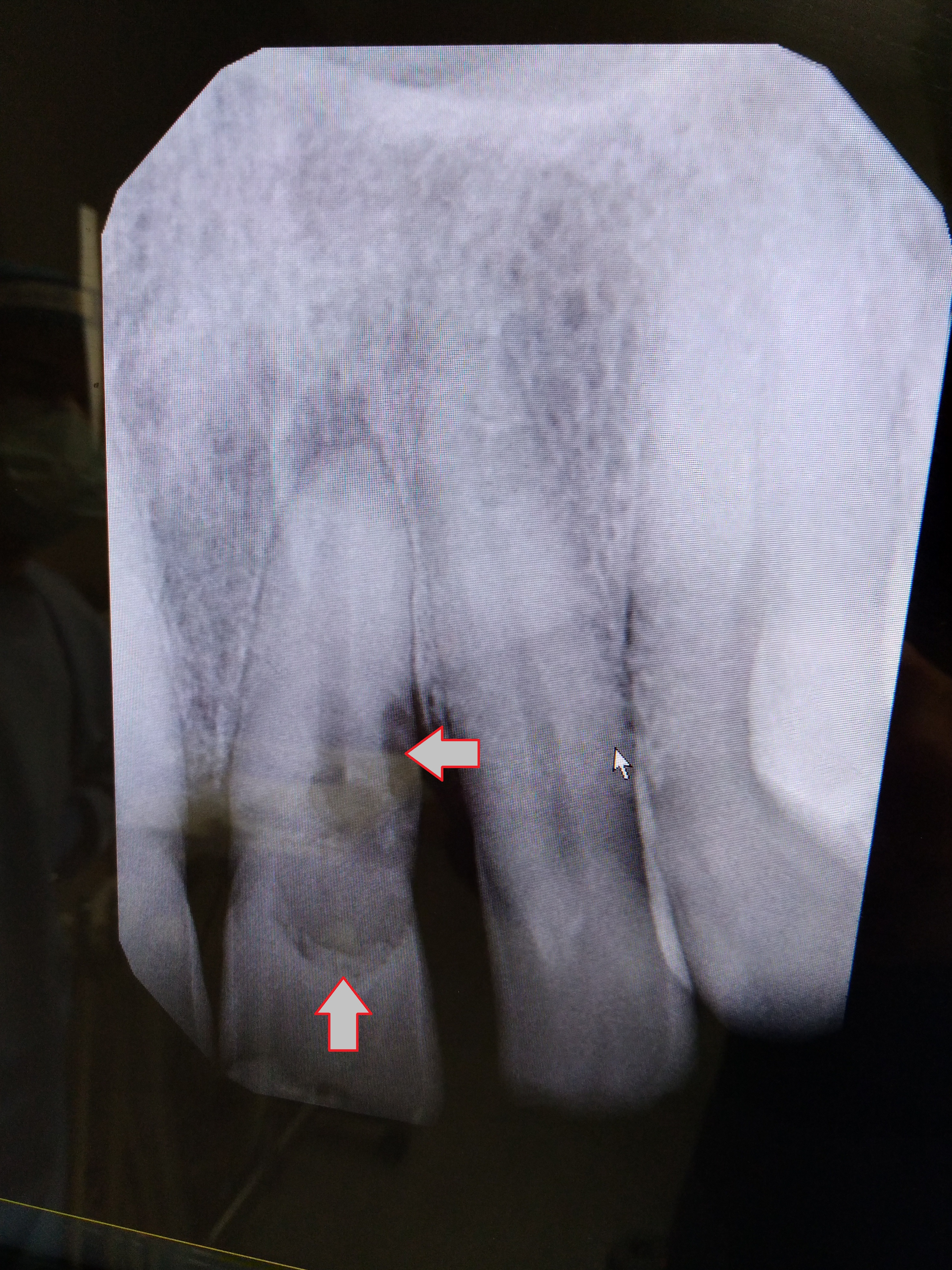
X-Ray of affected tooth (incisor 9, left).

The pathophysiology of root resorption is not completely understood. It is postulated that osteoclasts are the cells responsible for the resorption of the root surface. Osteoclasts can break down bone, cartilage and dentin.

Receptive activator of nuclear factor kappa-B ligand (RANKL), also called osteoclast differentiation factor (ODF) and osteoprotegerin ligand (OPGL), is a regulator of osteoclast function. In physiological bone turn over, osteoblasts and stromal cells release RANKL, this acts on macrophages and monocytes which fuse and become osteoclasts. Osteoprotegerin (OPG) is also secreted by osteoclasts and stromal cells; this inhibits RANKL and therefore osteoclast activity.

One thought is that the presence of bacteria plays a role. Bacterial presence leads to pulpal or peri-periapical inflammation. These bacteria are not mediators of osteoclast activity but do cause leukocyte chemotaxis. Leukocytes differentiate into osteoclasts in the presence of lipopolysaccharide antigens found in Porphyromonas, Prevotella and Treponema species (these are all bacterial species associated with pulpal or periapical inflammation).

Osteoclasts are active during bone regulation, there is constant equilibrium between bone resorption and deposition. Damage to the periodontal ligament can lead to RANKL release activating osteoclasts. Osteoclasts in close proximity to the root surface will resorb the root surface cementum and underlying root dentin. This can vary in severity from evidence of microscopic pits in the root surface to complete devastation of the root surface.

When there is insult leading to inflammation (trauma, bacteria, tooth whitening, orthodontic movement, periodontal treatment) in the root canal/s or beside the external surface of the root, cytokines are produced, the RANKL system is activated and osteoclasts are activated and resorb the root surface.

If the insult is transient, resorption will stop and healing will occur, this is known as transient inflammatory resorption. If the insult is persistent, then resorption continues, and if the tooth tissue is irretrievably damaged, complete resorption may occur.

== Classifications ==
Resorptive lesions are categorized as internal or external and then further subdivided based on their etiology.

=== Internal root resorption ===
Internal resorption is defined by the loss of intraradicular dentin and tubular dentin from within the middle and apical thirds of the root canal(s).

It may also present as an incidental, radiographic finding. Radiographically, a radiolucent area of uniform density within the root canal may be visible with well-defined borders. Canal walls may appear sclerosed, thus the outline of pulp chambers or root canals may not be followed through the lesion. Lesions may also be oval radiolucencies that are continuous with the canal walls.

Chronic pulpal inflammation is thought to be a cause of internal resorption. The pulp must be vital below the area of resorption to provide osteoclasts with nutrients. If the pulp becomes totally necrosed the resorption will cease unless lateral canals are present to supply osteoclasts with nutrients.

If the condition is discovered before perforation of the root has occurred, endodontic therapy (root canal therapy) may be carried out with the expectation of a fairly high success rate. Removing the stimulus (inflamed pulp) results in cessation of the resorptive process.

=== External root resorption ===
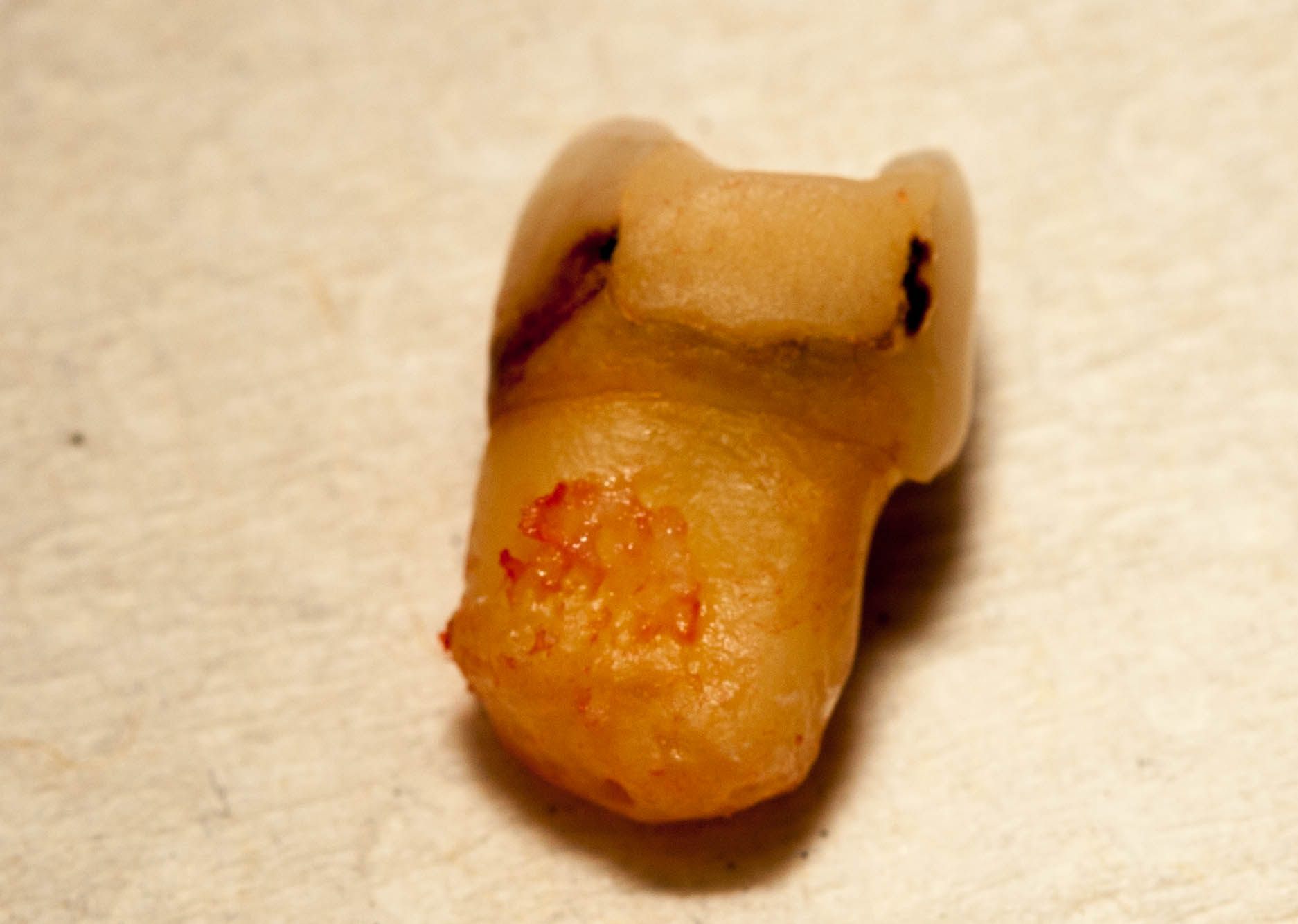
external root resorption premolar 25.

External resorption is the loss of tooth structure from the external surface of the tooth and is further subcategorized based on its etiology.

==== External Inflammatory Root Resorption ====
External inflammatory root resorption may be caused by trauma to the root surface, due to damage to the periodontal ligament (PDL) and/or extended drying following tooth avulsion. Following trauma, dentinal tubules are exposed leading to communication with an infective or necrotic pulp. This leads to an inflammatory process that causes external root resorption.

Alternatively, pressure may also cause external inflammatory root resorption. Specifically, application of heavy, continuous, and intrusive (i.e. directed toward the bone) forces during orthodontic tooth movement are associated with external root resorption.

==== External Surface Root Resorption ====
Occurs due to a localized and limited injury to the root surface or periodontium. It is a transient, self-limiting process of resorption that ceases after removal of the traumatic stimulus and is followed by healing of root surface, cementum, and periodontal ligament.

==== External Cervical Root Resorption ====
External cervical resorption is a localised resorptive lesion in the cervical area of the tooth, below the epithelial attachment. It is distinguished from external inflammatory root resorption in that it rarely involves the pulp. When at least 3 teeth are affected, it is referred to as multiple idiopathic cervical root resorption. The causes of external cervical root resorption are poorly understood but trauma, periodontal treatment, and/or tooth whitening may be predisposing factors.

==== External Replacement Root Resorption ====
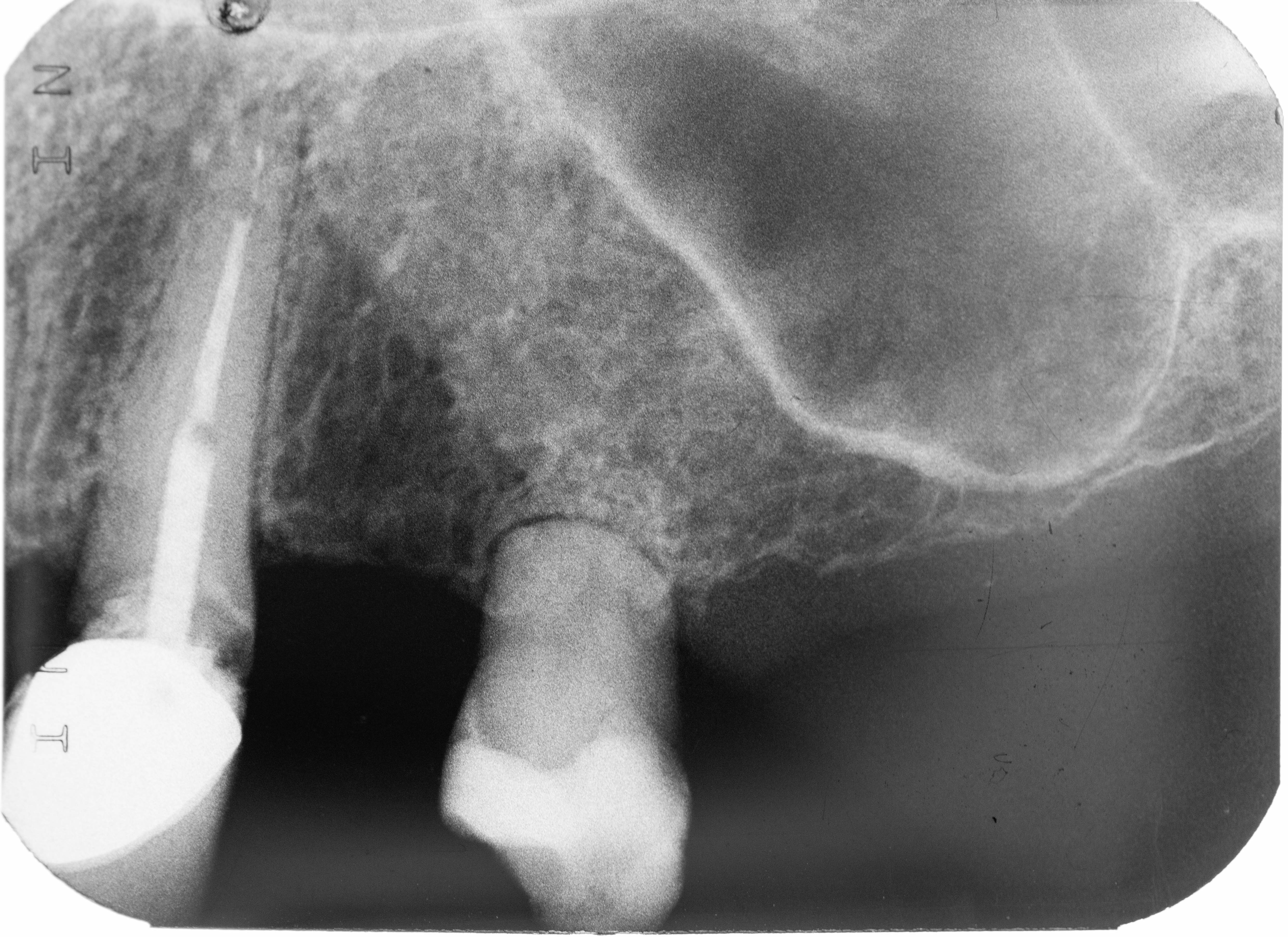
x-ray of external root resorption premolar 25.

External replacement root resorption (ERRR) occurs due to replacement of the root surface with bone, i.e. ankylosis. ERRR can be further categorized as transient or progressive depending on the extent of periodontal ligament damage with the latter resulting in complete root resorption.

== Clinical considerations ==
Orthodontically induced external root resorption (OIERR) may occur during orthodontic treatment. The use of heavy, continuous force increases the incidence and severity of OIERR. Additionally, forces directed toward the bone (i.e. intrusive) or lingual torque may also cause OEIRR. Interestingly, previous root trauma and unusual root morphology do not predispose one to OEIRR. Furthermore, endodontically treated teeth do not increase OIERR due to the absence of a vital pulp that can induce inflammation. Thus, it is recommended to take screening radiographs to detect for OIERR as indicated, use light forces especially for intrusive movements, and perform endodontic treatment if needed.

However, due to the lack of robust evidence in treatment of other forms of external root resorption, there is currently no single recommended best treatment for the management of external root resorption. Treatments are case-dependent and dependent on clinical judgment and experience. Therefore, more research is needed in this area.

== See also ==
- Cementoblastoma
- Tooth ankylosis
- Feline odontoclastic resorptive lesion
