= Cementogenesis =

Formation of cementum during tooth development

In animal tooth development, cementogenesis is the formation of cementum, one of the three mineralized substances of a tooth. Cementum covers the roots of teeth and serves to anchor gingival and periodontal fibers of the periodontal ligament by the fibers to the alveolar bone (some types of cementum may also form on the surface of the enamel of the crown at the cementoenamel junction (CEJ)).

== Process ==
For cementogenesis to begin, Hertwig epithelial root sheath (HERS) must fragment. HERS is a collar of epithelial cells derived from the apical prolongation of the enamel organ. Once the root sheath disintegrates, the newly formed surface of root dentin comes into contact with the undifferentiated cells of the dental sac (dental follicle). This then stimulates the activation of cementoblasts to begin cementogenesis. The external shape of each root is fully determined by the position of the surrounding Hertwig epithelial root sheath.

It is believed that either 1) HERS becomes interrupted; 2) infiltrating dental sac cells receive a reciprocal inductive signal from the dentin; or 3) HERS cells transform into cementoblasts.

The cementoblasts then disperse to cover the root dentin area and undergo cementogenesis, laying down cementoid. During the later steps within the stage of apposition, many of the cementoblasts become entrapped by the cementum they produce, becoming cementocytes. When the cementoid reaches the full thickness needed, the cementoid surrounding the cementocytes becomes mineralized, or matured, and is then considered cementum. Because of the apposition of cementum over the dentin, the dentinocemental junction (DCJ) is formed.

After the apposition of cementum in layers, the cementoblasts that do not become entrapped in cementum line up along the cemental surface along the length of the outer covering of the periodontal ligament. These cementoblasts can form subsequent layers of cementum if the tooth is injured. Cementum grows slowly, by surface apposition, throughout life.

== See also ==
- Cementum
- Cementoblast
- Hertwig epithelial root sheath
