= Cementoblastoma =

Benign tumor of the teeth roots

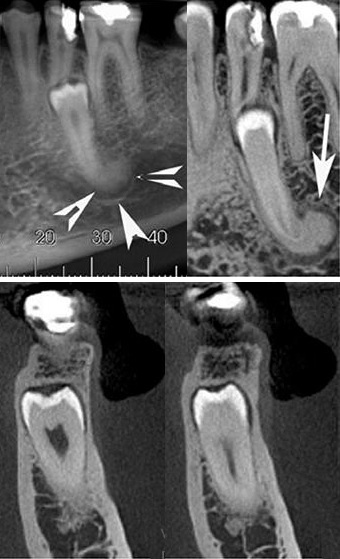
- Cone beam CT images showing a well-defined hyperdense round lesion attached to the root of supernumerary mandibular tooth (arrow head) with a surrounding hypodense rim.
- Specialty: Dentistry

Cementoblastoma, or benign cementoblastoma, is a relatively rare benign neoplasm of the cementum of the teeth. It is derived from ectomesenchyme of odontogenic origin, with the formation of cementum-like tissue around the associated tooth root. Cementoblastomas represent less than 0.69–8% of all odontogenic tumors. The oldest case of cementoblastoma that has been verified dates back to 1888 by J. Metnitz. He described a lesion as a hard rounded mass associated with root resorption, periosteum coverage, rows of bone cells, and pulp chamber involvement. At the time, the lesion was diagnosed as an "odontoma", but later it was found that a diagnosis of cementoblastoma better matched the description.

== Diagnostic features ==
Clinical

Cementoblastoma usually occurs in people between the ages of 20 and 30, equally affecting males and females. It is more commonly found in the mandible compared to the maxilla (3.4:1), with 40% of cases being found in the first mandibular molar area and incisor involvement being extremely rare. Cementoblastoma rarely affects primary dentition. The latest case reports suggest that only 21 cases of cementoblastoma involving primary teeth have been found in the English literature, 66% of which occurring on the right side.

Radiographic

Cementoblastoma is slow growing well-defined, radiopaque mass, with a radiolucent peripheral line, that overlies and obliterates the tooth root typically presenting with root resorption. It has a rounded or sunburst appearance. Differential diagnosis include severe hypercementosis, chronic focal sclerosing osteomyelitis, and osteoma.

Histologic

Cementoblastoma can be characterized by a fibrous stroma containing a dense collection of acellular material that is cementum-like with basophilic reversal lines.

Molecular

Due to advances in genome sequencing, molecular signatures of odontogenic cysts and tumors are being investigated to aid in differential diagnosis. Rearrangement of the FOS gene and overexpression of c-FOS have been identified in cementoblastoma, similar to osteoblastoma suggesting a link in the disease process of these two tumors.

== Treatment ==
Surgical enucleation of the lesion is done, and depending upon the clinical circumstances, this involve removal of the involved tooth. Recurrence rate ranges from as high as 37.1% to 11.8% with bone expansion and the perforation of the cortical bone predicting greater recurrence.

== See also ==
- Cementum
- Cementogenesis
- Cementoblast
