= Periodontic =

Periodontic may refer to:

- Periodontium, the gums and tissues that surround, and structures that support, the teeth
- Periodontics or Periodontology, the specialty of dentistry that studies the periodontium
- periodontal disease, such as periodontitis
