= Resorption =

Absorption of cells or tissue into the circulatory system

Resorption is the absorption of cells or tissue into the circulatory system, usually by osteoclasts.

== Types ==
Types of resorption include:

- Bone resorption
- Herniated Disc Resorption
- Tooth resorption
- Fetal resorption
- Blood resorption

== See also ==
- Nutrient resorption, in plants
