= Hypercementosis =

Excessive buildup of normal cementum on the roots of teeth

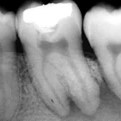
- Specialty: Dentistry

Hypercementosis is an idiopathic, non-neoplastic condition characterized by the excessive buildup of normal cementum (calcified tissue) on the roots of one or more teeth. A thicker layer of cementum can give the tooth an enlarged appearance, mainly occurring at the apex or apices of the tooth. The cellular cementum functions at the bottom half of the tooth roots which contain cementocytes that anchor the tooth into the jaw socket, protect the tooth's pulp, and repair external root resorption.

== Signs and symptoms ==
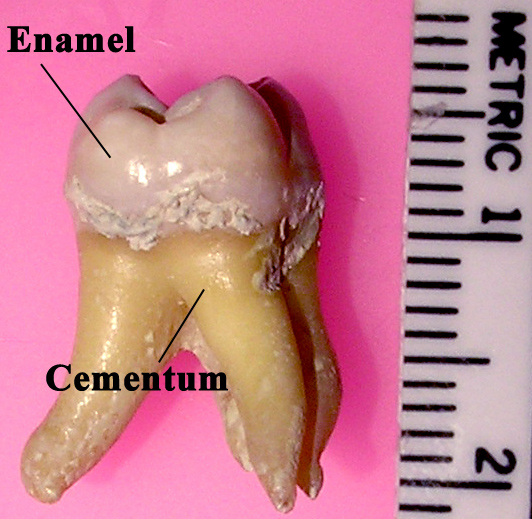
Location of where excess cementum may appear

It is experienced as an uncomfortable sensation in the tooth, followed by an aching pain. Excess amounts of cementum may cause pressure on periodontal ligaments and adjacent teeth. The teeth affected may present as asymptomatic. It may be shown on radiographs as a radiopaque (or lighter) mass at each root apex to confirm the diagnosis.

== Cause ==
Trauma and other developmental disorders such as Paget's disease may be more prone to develop hypercementosis in the maxillary region.

Local factors:

- Occlusal trauma
- Trauma
- Non-functional tooth
- Unopposed tooth (and impacted teeth, embedded teeth, teeth without antagonists)

Systemic factors:

- Idiopathic
- Pituitary gigantism
- Paget's disease of bone
- Acromegaly
- Periapical granuloma
- Arthritis
- Calcinosis
- Rheumatic fever

It may be one of the complications of Paget's disease of bone in the form of generalized hypercementosis.

It may also be a compensatory mechanism in response to attrition to increase occlusal tooth height.

== Pathophysiology ==
Research has suggested that mutations in the ENPP1 and GACI genes may contribute to the development of hypercementosis. Loss of function in ENPP1 caused generalized arterial calcification of infancy (GACI) which was directly associated with individuals with hypercementosis. When ENPP1 is inhibited, there is a deficiency in pyrophosphate (PPi) that regulates the mineralization of bone by stopping hydroxyapatite crystals from forming. PPi naturally inhibits crystal formation in inappropriate areas such as in the sub-gingival area. Loss of control in PPi may result in excessive cementum deposition in the lower third of the tooth.

== Diagnosis ==
Periapical radiographs can locate radiopaque structures in proximity to the root which can appear as dense bone islands or periapical osseous dysplasia in cases of hypercementosis. The majority of affected teeth appear club-shaped due to cemental hyperplasia diffusing in a variety of severities. Most appear in the apical third of the root.

== Complications ==
Such deposits form bulbous enlargements on the roots and may interfere with extractions, especially if adjacent teeth become fused (concrescence). It may also result in pulpal necrosis by blocking blood supply via the apical foramen. Teeth affected do not necessarily need treatment unless it causes complications to adjacent teeth and structures.

== Epidemiology ==
Hypercementosis occurs more frequently in adults and increases with age. Teeth that are affected are primary mandibular molars followed by secondary premolars in the mandible and maxilla, however any teeth may be affected. While no one race is primarily affected, those with conditions that affect bone hormone levels such as Paget's disease and acromegaly are more likely to develop hypercementosis.

== Treatment ==
While treatment is not necessary if teeth are asymptomatic, it is crucial to monitor the progression of hypercementosis to reduce the chances of surrounding teeth being affected. If pain is associated with teeth affected by hypercementosis, extractions or endodontic treatment may be required. A risk assessment must be considered as excess cementum build-up may make determining the apical limit challenging during a root canal. The prognosis is the same as a regular tooth as long as the root canal is done properly.

== Recent Research ==
A recent study has proposed a "teeth-as-tools" hypothesis that suggests early humans may have used anterior teeth for non-dietary purposes. When excessive mechanical force is used in this way, it stimulates the production of cementum to improve the stability of the tooth. Research focuses on the types of occlusion and contamination that may give insight into how Neanderthals adapted to diverse challenges in the world.
