= Periodontal membrane =

Periodontal membrane may refer to:

- The periodontal ligament (PDL), largely referred to as the periodontal membrane outside of the United States
- An artificial periodontal membrane, used to block the spread of growing epithelium after periodontal surgery.
- Also is used as a term by dentists to the part of the tooth which holds the cement to the jaw bone.
