= Occlusal trauma =

Damage to teeth due to excessive force

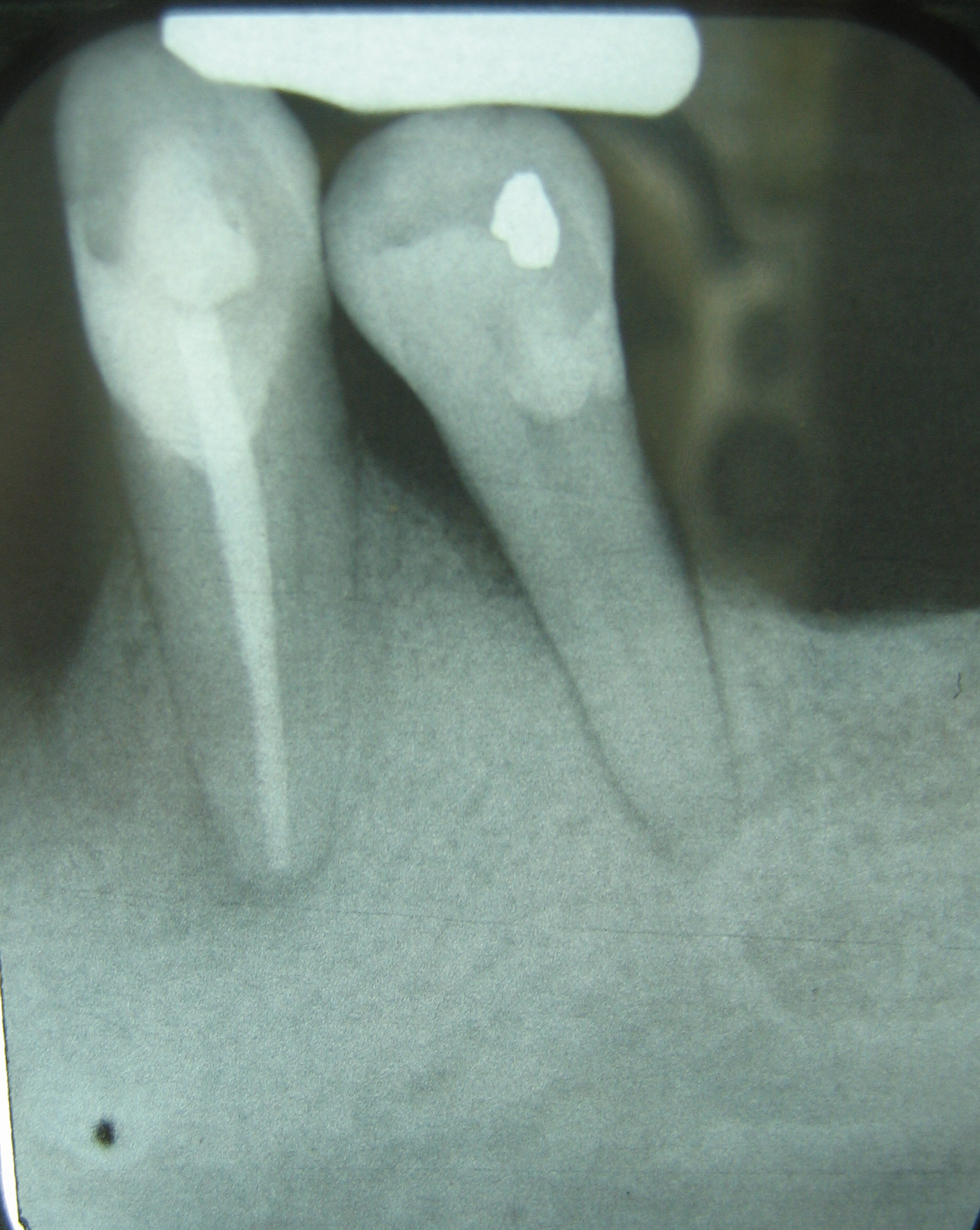
- Secondary occlusal trauma on X-ray film displays two lone-standing mandibular teeth, the lower left first premolar and canine. As the remnants of a once full complement of 16 lower teeth, these two teeth have been alone in opposing the forces associated with mastication for some time, as can be evidenced by the widened PDL surrounding the premolar. Because this trauma is occurring on teeth that have 30-50% bone loss, this would be classified as secondary.
- Specialty: Dentistry

Occlusal trauma is the damage to teeth when an excessive force is acted upon them and they do not align properly.

When the jaws close, for instance during chewing or at rest, the relationship between the opposing teeth is referred to as occlusion. When trauma, disease or dental treatment alters occlusion by changing the biting surface of any of the teeth, the teeth will come together differently, and their occlusion will change. When that change has a negative effect on how the teeth occlude, this may cause tenderness, pain, and damage to or movement of the teeth. This is called traumatic occlusion.

Traumatic occlusion may cause a thickening of the cervical margin of the alveolar bone and widening of the periodontal ligament, although the latter can also be caused by other processes.

== Signs and symptoms ==
Clinically, there is a number of physiological results that serve as evidence of occlusal trauma:,

- Progressive tooth mobility
- Fremitus
- Tooth migration
- Pain
- Thermal sensitivity
- Pain on chewing or percussion
- Wear facets

== Diagnosis ==
Microscopically, there will be a number of features that accompany occlusal trauma:

- Hemorrhage
- Necrosis
- Widening of the periodontal ligament, or PDL (also serves as a very common radiographic feature)
- Bone resorption
- Cementum loss and tears

It was concluded that widening of the periodontal ligament was a "functional adaptation to changes in functional requirements".

== Primary vs. secondary ==
There are two types of occlusal trauma, primary and secondary.

=== Primary ===
Primary occlusal trauma occurs when excessive occlusal forces are placed on teeth, as in the case of off axis loading, parafunctional habits, such as bruxism or various chewing or biting habits, including but not limited to those involving fingernails and pencils or pens.

The associated excessive forces can be grouped into four categories. Excesses of: Duration Frequency Magnitude, and Direction (off axis loading)

Primary occlusal trauma will occur when there is an adequate periodontal attachment apparatus. It is reversible if the cause of the trauma is corrected.

=== Secondary ===
Secondary occlusal trauma occurs when normal or excessive occlusal forces are placed on teeth with compromised periodontal attachment, The loss of support must be to the level whereby the signs of occlusal trauma such as mobility remain even if the source of the trauma is corrected. The distinction between primary and secondary occlusal trauma is important because a diagnosis of secondary occlusal trauma implies the need for splinting.

== Cause and treatment ==
Teeth are constantly subject to both horizontal and vertical occlusal forces. With the center of rotation of the tooth acting as a fulcrum, the surface of bone adjacent to the pressured side of the tooth will undergo resorption and disappear, while the surface of bone adjacent to the tensioned side of the tooth will undergo apposition and increase in volume.

In both primary and secondary occlusal trauma, tooth mobility might develop over time, with it occurring earlier and being more prevalent in secondary occlusal trauma. To treat mobility due to primary occlusal trauma, the cause of the trauma must be eliminated. Likewise for teeth subject to secondary occlusal trauma, though these teeth may also require splinting together to the adjacent teeth so as to eliminate their mobility.

In primary occlusal trauma, the cause of the mobility was the excessive force being applied to a tooth with an adequate attachment apparatus. The approach should be to eliminate the cause of the pain and mobility by determining the causes and removing them; the mobile tooth or teeth will soon cease exhibiting mobility. This could involve removing a high spot on a recently restored tooth, or even a high spot on a non-recently restored tooth that perhaps moved into hyperocclusion. It could also involve altering one's parafunctional habits, such as refraining from chewing on pens or biting one's fingernails. For a bruxer, treatment of the patient's primary occlusal trauma could involve selective grinding of certain interarch tooth contacts or perhaps employing a nightguard to protect the teeth from the greater than normal occlusal forces of the patient's parafunctional habit. For someone who is missing enough teeth in non-strategic positions so that the remaining teeth are forced to endure a greater per square inch occlusal force, treatment might include restoration with either a removable prosthesis or implant-supported crown or bridge.

In secondary occlusal trauma, simply removing the "high spots" or selective grinding of the teeth will not eliminate the problem, because the teeth are already periodontally compromised. After splinting the teeth to eliminate the mobility, the cause of the mobility (in other words, the loss of clinical attachment and bone) must be managed; this is achieved through surgical periodontal procedures such as soft tissue and bone grafts, as well as restoration of edentulous areas. As with primary occlusal trauma, treatment may include either a removable prosthesis or implant-supported crown or bridge.
