= Alveolar process =

Region of jaw bones containing tooth sockets

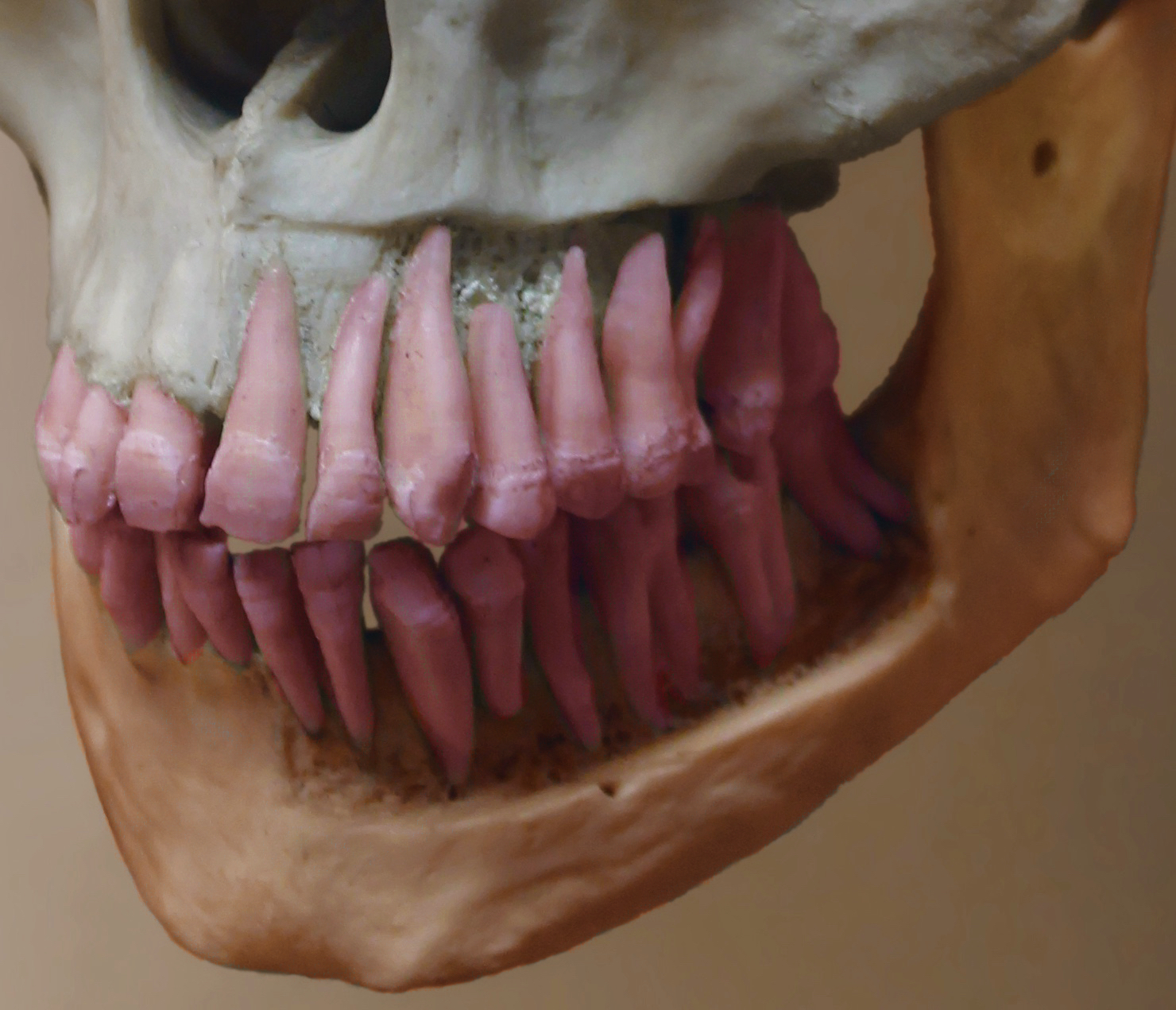
- Alveolar region of the maxilla (white) and mandible (orange) cut away to the right

Details
- System: Skeletal

Identifiers
- Latin: os alveolaris
- MeSH: D000539
- TA98: A02.1.12.035
- TA2: 791
- FMA: 59487 52897, 59487

The alveolar process (/ælˈviːələr, ˌælviˈoʊlər, ˈælviələr/) is the portion of bone containing the tooth sockets on the jaw bones (in humans, the maxilla and the mandible). The alveolar process is covered by gums within the mouth, terminating roughly along the line of the mandibular canal. Partially comprising compact bone, it is penetrated by many small openings for blood vessels and connective fibres.

The bone is of clinical, phonetic and forensic significance.

== Terminology ==
The term alveolar (/ælˈviːələr/) ('hollow') refers to the cavities of the tooth sockets, known as dental alveoli. The alveolar process is also called the alveolar bone or alveolar ridge. The curved portion of the process is referred to as the alveolar arch.

The alveolar bone proper, also called bundle bone, directly surrounds the teeth. The terms alveolar border, alveolar crest, and alveolar margin describe the extreme rim of the bone nearest to the crowns of the teeth. The part of alveolar bone between two adjacent teeth is known as the interdental septum (or interdental bone). The connected, supporting area of the jaw (delineated by the apexes of the roots of the teeth) is known as the basal bone.

In phonetics, alveolar ridge refers more specifically to the ridges on the inside of the mouth which can be felt with the tongue, either on roof of the mouth between the upper teeth and the hard palate or on the bottom of the mouth behind the lower teeth.

== Structure ==
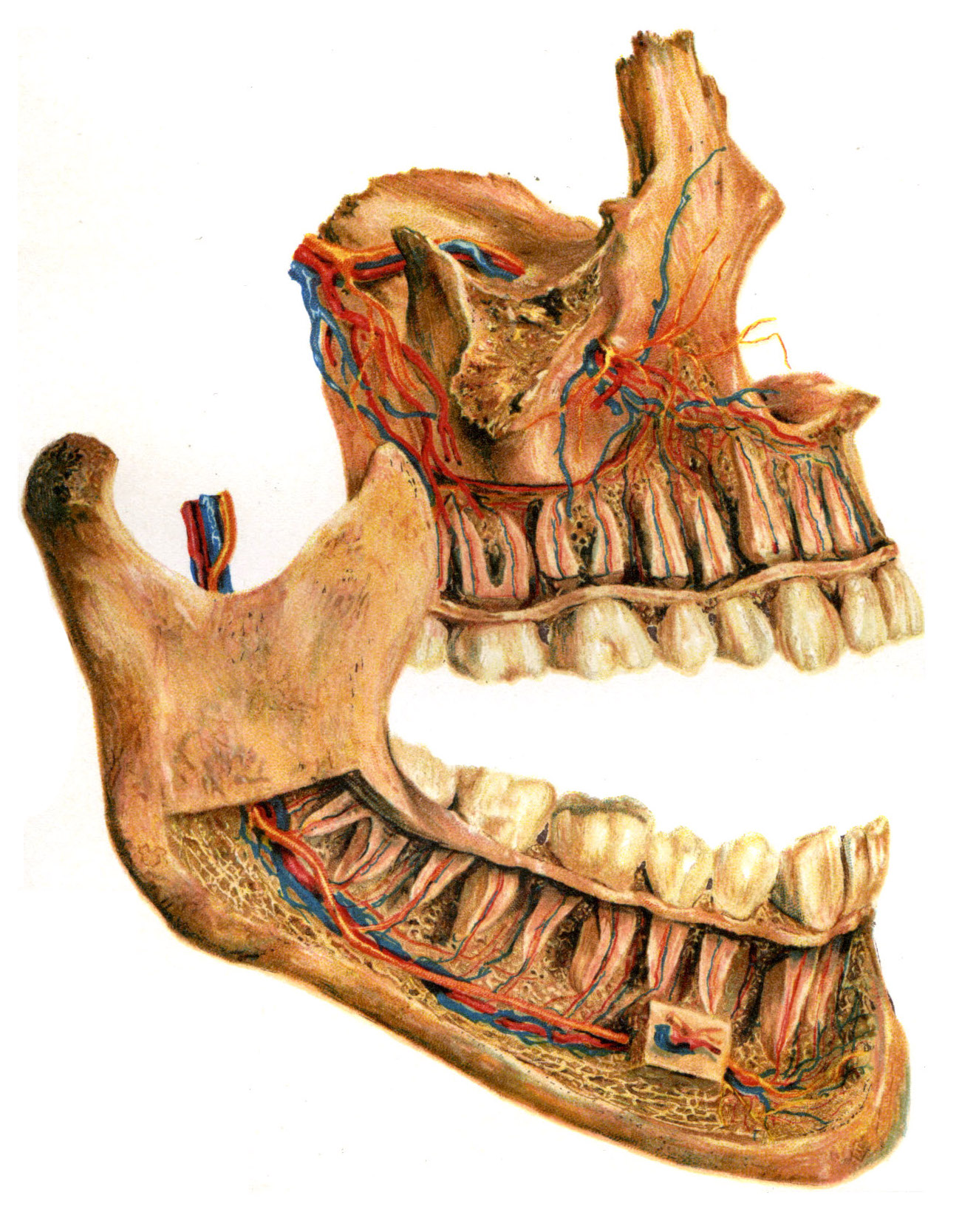
German illustration (c. 1910) depicting interior of jawbones, with nerves, veins, and arteries leading to teeth—and thus the alveolar area

On the maxilla, the alveolar process is a ridge on the inferior surface, making up the thickest part of the bone. On the mandible it is a ridge on the superior surface. The structures hold the teeth (at an angle) and are enshrouded by the gums, part of the oral mucosa. The alveolar process comprises cells and periosteum. It both contains and is penetrated by nerves, blood vessels, and lymphatic vessels. The alveolar crest terminates uniformly at about the neck of the teeth (within about 1 to 2 millimetres in a healthy specimen), while the alveolar process terminates along the line of the mandibular canal.

The alveolar process proper encases the tooth sockets, and contains a lining of compact bone around the roots of the teeth, called the lamina dura. This is attached by the periodontal ligament (PDL) to the root cementum. Although the alveolar process is composed of compact bone, it may be called the cribriform plate because it contains numerous openings known as Volkmann's canals, which allow blood vessels to pass between the alveolar bone and the PDL. The alveolar bone proper is also called bundle bone because Sharpey fibers, part of the PDL, are inserted there. Sharpey fibers in alveolar bone proper are inserted at a right angle (just as with the cemental surface); they are fewer in number, but thicker in diameter than those found in cementum.

The supporting alveolar bone consists of both cortical (compact) bone and trabecular bone. The cortical bone consists of plates on the facial and lingual surfaces of the alveolar bone. These cortical plates are usually about 1.5 to 3 mm thick over posterior teeth, but the thickness is highly variable around anterior teeth. The trabecular bone consists of cancellous bone that is located between the alveolar bone proper and the cortical plates.

The alveolar structure is a dynamic tissue which provides the jawbone with some degree of flexibility and resilience for the embedded teeth as they encounter numerous multi-directional forces.

=== Composition ===
Alveolar bone is 67% inorganic material, composed mainly of the minerals calcium and phosphate. The mineral salts it contains are mostly in the form of calcium hydroxyapatite crystals. The remaining alveolar bone (33%) is organic material, consisting of 28% collagen (mostly type I) and 5% non-collagenous protein.

The cellular component of bone consists of osteoblasts, osteocytes and osteoclasts.

== Clinical significance ==
=== Alveolar bone loss ===
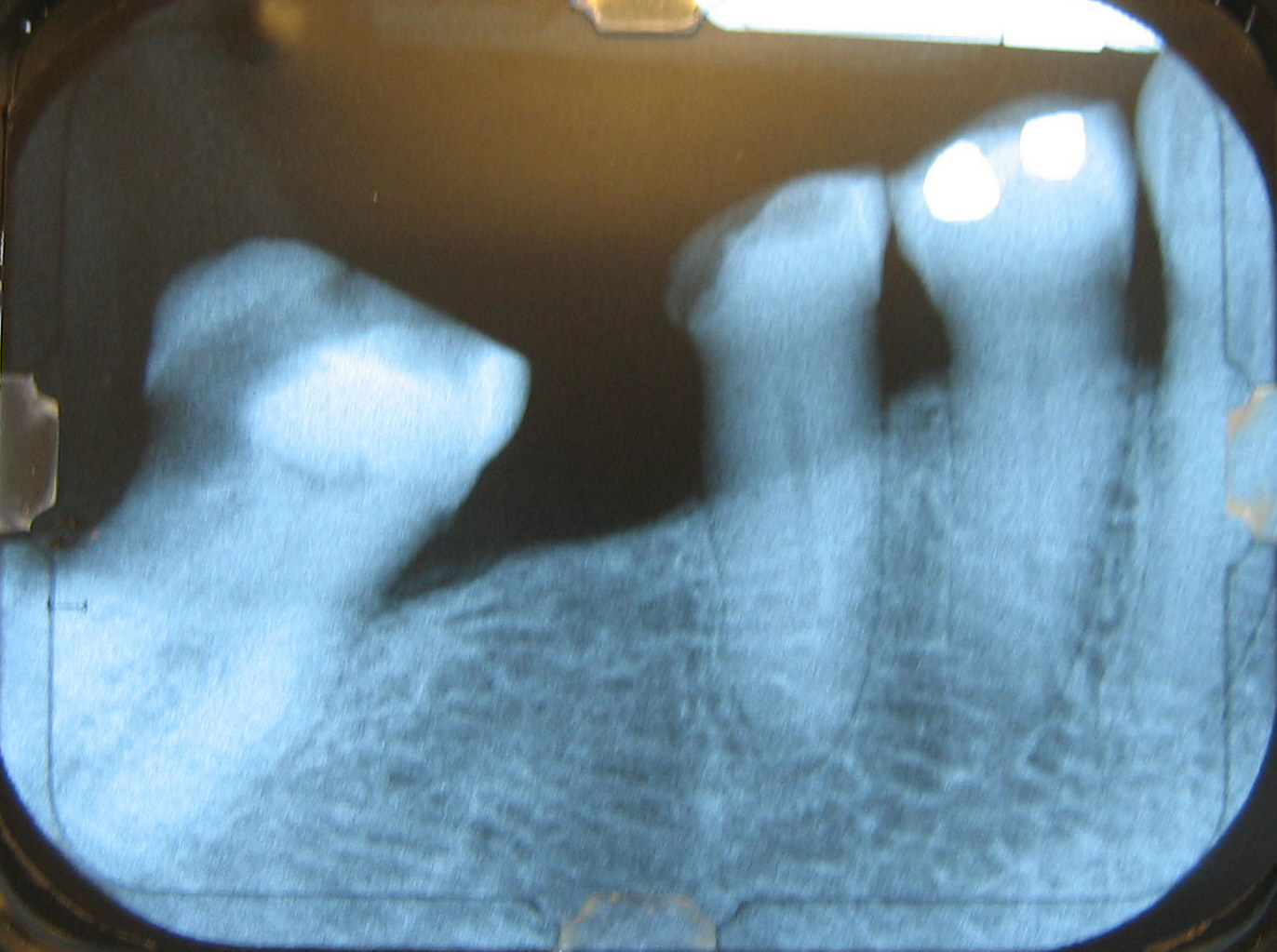
This X-ray film reveals some bone loss on the right side of the mandible. The associated teeth exhibit poor crown-to-root ratios and may be subject to secondary occlusal trauma.

Bone is lost through the process of resorption which involves osteoclasts breaking down the hard tissue of bone. A key indication of resorption is when scalloped erosion occurs. This is also known as Howship's lacuna. The resorption phase lasts as long as the lifespan of the osteoclast which is around 8 to 10 days. After this resorption phase, the osteoclast can continue resorbing surfaces in another cycle or carry out apoptosis. A repair phase follows the resorption phase which lasts over 3 months. In patients with periodontal disease, inflammation lasts longer and during the repair phase, resorption may override any bone formation. This results in a net loss of alveolar bone.

Alveolar bone loss is closely associated with periodontal disease. Periodontal disease involves the inflammation of the gingiva (gums) or gingivitis. Studies in osteoimmunology have proposed 2 models for alveolar bone loss. One model states that inflammation is triggered by a periodontal pathogen which activates the acquired immune system to inhibit bone coupling by limiting new bone formation after resorption. Another model states that cytokinesis may inhibit the differentiation of osteoblasts from their precursors, therefore limiting bone formation. This results in a net loss of alveolar bone.

=== Developmental disturbances ===
The developmental disturbance of anodontia (or hypodontia, if only one tooth), in which tooth germs are congenitally absent, may affect the development of the alveolar processes. This occurrence can prevent the alveolar processes of either the maxillae or the mandible from developing. Proper development is impossible because the alveolar unit of each dental arch must form in response to the tooth germs in the area.

=== Pathology ===
After extraction of a tooth, the clot in the alveolus fills in with immature bone, which later is remodeled into mature secondary bone. Disturbance of the blood clot can cause alveolar osteitis, commonly referred to as "dry socket". With the partial or total loss of teeth, the alveolar process undergoes resorption. The underlying basal bone of the body of the maxilla or mandible remains less affected, however, because it does not need the presence of teeth to remain viable. The loss of alveolar bone, coupled with attrition of the teeth, causes a loss of height of the lower third of the vertical dimension of the face when the teeth are in maximum intercuspation. The extent of this loss is determined based on clinical judgment using the Golden Proportions.

The density of the alveolar bone in a given area also determines the route that dental infection takes with abscess formation, as well as the efficacy of local infiltration during the use of local anesthesia. In addition, the differences in alveolar process density determine the easiest and most convenient areas of bony fracture to be used, if needed during tooth extraction of impacted teeth. During chronic periodontal disease that has affected the periodontium (periodontitis), localized bone tissue is also lost. The radiographic integrity of the lamina dura is important in detecting pathologic lesions. It appears uniformly radiopaque (or lighter).

=== Alveolar bone grafting ===
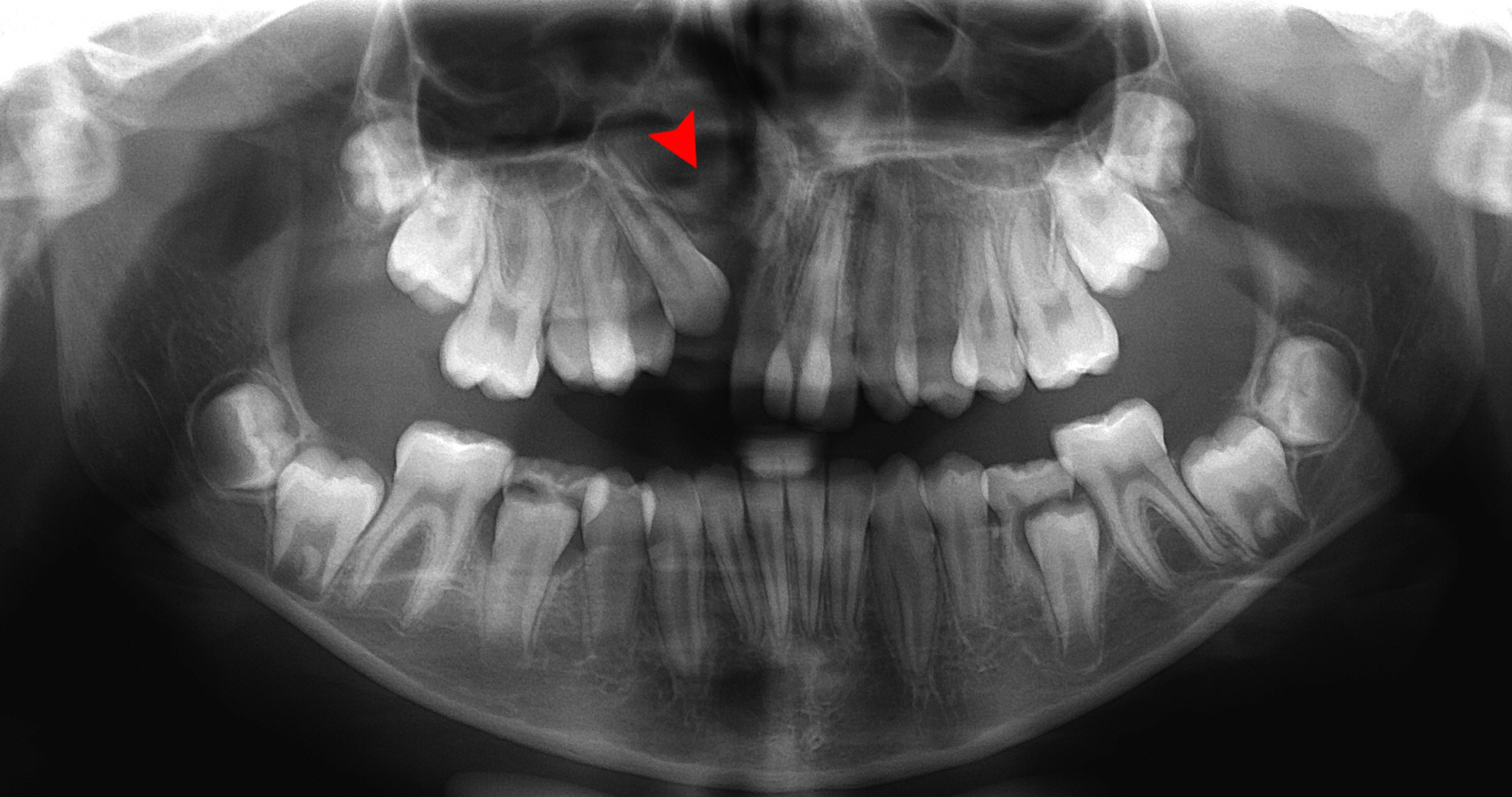
X-ray showing alveolar defect causing cleft lip and cleft palate

Alveolar bone grafting in the mixed dentition is an essential part of the reconstructive journey for cleft lip and cleft palate patients. The reconstruction of the alveolar cleft can provide both aesthetic and practical advantages to the patient. Alveolar bone grafting can also bring about the following benefits: stabilisation of the maxillary arch; aid of eruption of the canine and sometimes lateral incisor eruption; offering bony support to the teeth lying next to the cleft; elevate the alar base of the nose; aid sealing of oro-nasal fistula; permit insertion of a titanium fixture in the grafted region and achieve good periodontal conditions within and next to the cleft. The timing of the alveolar bone grafting takes into consideration both eruption of the canine and lateral incisor. The optimal time for bone grafting surgery is when a thin shell of bone still covers the soon erupting lateral incisor or canine tooth close to the cleft.

- Primary bone grafting: Primary bone grafting is believed to: eliminate bone deficiency, stabilize pre-maxilla, synthesize new bone matrix for eruption of teeth in the cleft area and augment the alar base. However, the early bone grafting procedure is abandoned in most cleft lip and palate centres around the world due to many disadvantages, including serious growth disturbances of the middle third of the facial skeleton. The operative technique that involves the vomero-premaxillary suture was found to inhibit maxillary growth.
- Secondary bone grafting: Secondary bone grafting, also referred to as bone grafting in the mixed dentition, became a well-established procedure after abandoning primary bone grafting. The prerequisites include precise timing, operating technique, and acceptably vascularized soft tissue. The advantages of primary bone grafting, which are allowing tooth eruption through the grafted bone, are retained. Furthermore, secondary bone grafting stabilizes the maxillary arch, thus enhancing the conditions for prosthodontic treatment such as crowns, bridges and implants. It also aids eruption of teeth, boosting the amount of bony tissue on the alveolar crest, permitting orthodontic treatment. Bony support to teeth adjacent to the cleft is a pre-requisite for orthodontic closure of the teeth in the cleft region. Hence, better hygienic conditions will be achieved which helps to lessen formation of caries and periodontal inflammation. Speech problems caused by irregular positioning of articulators, or leakage of air via the oronasal communication, may also be improved. Secondary bone grafting can also be used to augment the alar base of the nose to achieve symmetry with the non-cleft side, thereby enhancing facial appearance.
- Late secondary bone grafting: Bone grafting has a lower success rate when performed after canine has erupted as compared to before the eruption. It has been found that the possibility for orthodontic closure of the cleft in the dental arch is smaller in patients grafted before canine eruption than those after the canine eruption. The surgical procedure includes drilling of several small openings through the cortical layer into the cancellous layer, facilitating growth of blood vessels into the graft.

=== Congenital epulis ===
Congenital epulis is a rare, benign mesenchymal tumour which usually presents at birth. It can be found growing on the alveolar ridge of newborns, presenting as non-ulcerated, pedunculated, reddish pink masses of varying sizes and numbers. Congenital epulis can occur in either of the alveolar ridges, but they are found three times more frequently on the maxillary alveolar ridge than on the mandibular alveolar ridge. They also more commonly present in females compared to males.

=== Dentistry ===
A sagittal (side view) of a human nasal and oral passage. The upper alveolar ridge is located between numbers 4 and 5.

The alveolar ridge is an area of particular interest in dentistry, as preservation of the ridges results in a higher success rate of therapeutic dental treatments.

The bone is softer than the cementum of the teeth, allowing the teeth to be slowly repositioned, creating PDL tension which in turn stimulates the deposition of new alveolar bone.

==== Grafting materials ====
Grafting is an effective technique to reduce the inevitable changes in dimension of the alveolar ridge after tooth extraction. The type of grafting material is important as different materials are more effective than others in maintaining the alveolar ridge.

No biomaterial can prevent alveolar bone loss entirely after extraction, however, there are five grafting materials with the greatest efficacy in height resorption prevention; three of which are xenograft materials (Gen-Os, Apatos, and MP3), one a platelet concentrate (A-PRF) and one composed of A-PRF and the allograft material AlloOss combined.

For the best outcomes with respect to horizontal alveolar ridge preservation, application of a xenogenic (non-living bone material from another species) or allogenic grafting material (bone donated by another human) surrounded by a resorbable collagen membrane or sponge is ideal. These membranes promote wound healing, osteogenesis and have a high biocompatibility. Other reliable options for surgeons may include Bio-Oss and Bio-Oss Coll, primarily due to the strong scientific evidence behind their efficacy and recorded successful outcomes particularly in lateral ridge augmentation surgery. L-PRF is also preferred in many clinical situations because of its low cost of preparation.

==== Dental implants ====
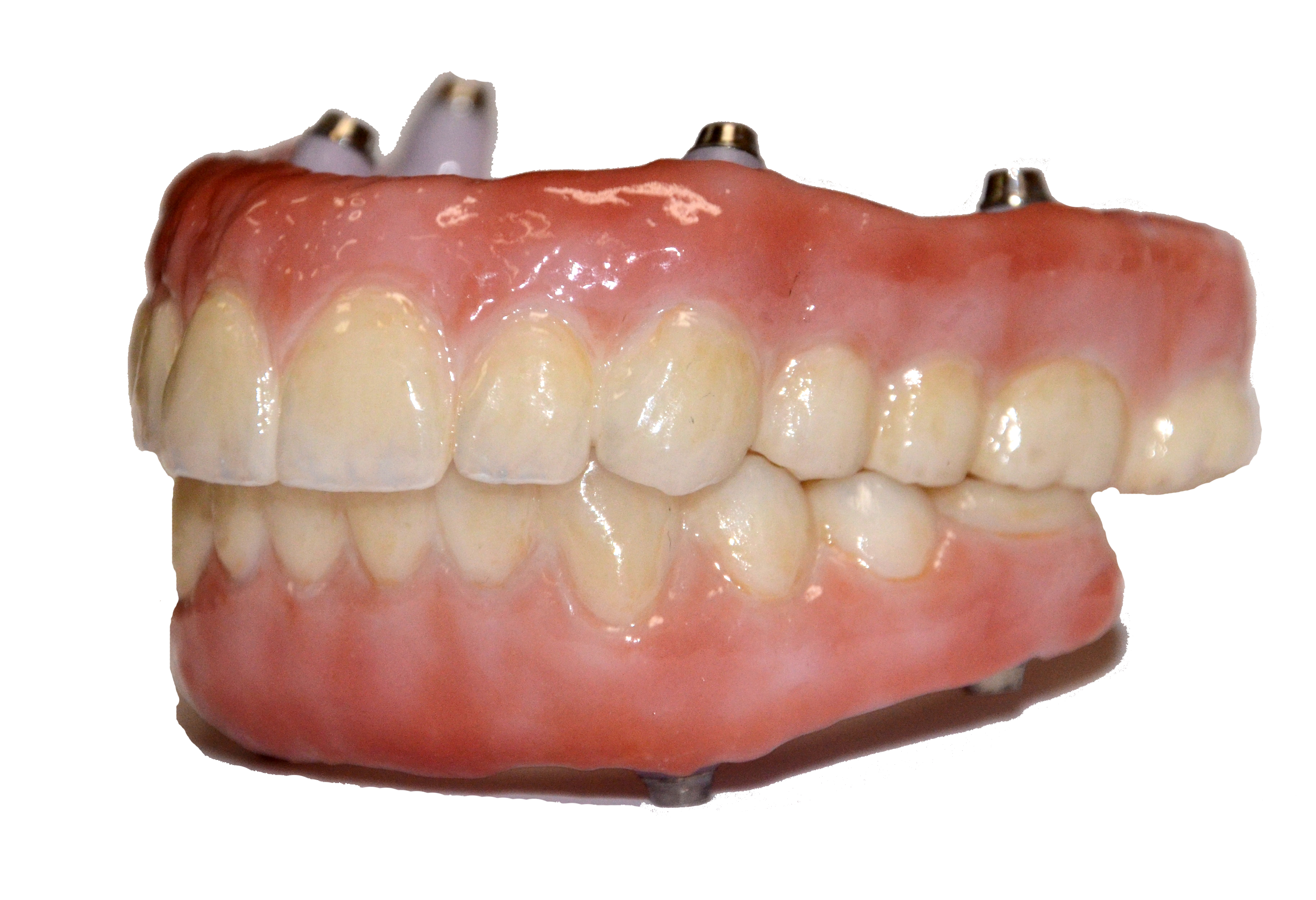
Dentures, one form of implant which can be attached to the alveolar region

As the rate of tooth loss in the population increases either due to early extraction, trauma, or other systemic diseases, the use of implant therapy has increased as a form of tooth replacement therapy. Dental implants are a way to replace missing teeth, as they consist of a titanium surgical component that is placed in the alveolar ridge of the jawbone. The implant then acts as a prosthetic device that can hold either a crown, bridge, or denture on its external surface. For the implant placement to be successful, there needs to be enough alveolar bone to support and stabilize the dental implant. It has been determined that many factors can contribute to the loss of both the vertical and horizontal height of the alveolar bone. These factors can include resorption of the bone after tooth removal (affecting the quality and quantity of the bone), the presence of periodontal disease, the age and gender of the patient, smoking habits, the presence of other systemic diseases, and oral hygiene habits. Although dental implants tend to have a high success rate, of about 99%, studies show that if an implant were to fail, it occurs more often in the front portion of the upper jaw. More research is required to determine why this occurs, but it has been theorized that the alveolar bone in the upper jaw has a thinner cortical plate and lower bone density than that of the lower jaw. As bone loss in the alveolar ridge becomes an increasing problem for the success of dental implants, research has been focused on the development of new surgical techniques and biomaterials that can be used to either maintain current bone levels, or to stimulate the growth of new alveolar bone through osteogenesis.

== Articulation ==
Consonants whose constriction is made with the tongue tip or blade touching or reaching for the alveolar ridge are called alveolar consonants. Examples of alveolar consonants in English are, for instance, [t], [d], [s], [z], [n], [l] like in the words tight, dawn, silly, zoo, nasty and lurid. There are exceptions to this however, such as speakers of the New York accent who pronounce [t] and [d] at the back of their top teeth (dental stops). When pronouncing these sounds the tongue touches ([t], [d], [n]), or nearly touches ([s], [z]) the upper alveolar ridge, which can also be referred to as gum ridge. In many other languages, consonants transcribed with these letters are articulated slightly differently, and are often described as dental consonants. In many languages consonants are articulated with the tongue touching or close to the upper alveolar ridge. The former are called alveolar plosives (such as [t] and [d]), and the latter alveolar fricatives (such as [s] and [ʃ]) or (such as [z] and [ʒ]).

== In culture ==
Other than a maxillar bridge made of gold, part of a mandible with teeth—which had been burned and broken around the alveolar process—was the only physical evidence used to confirm Adolf Hitler's death in 1945. Historians such as Anton Joachimsthaler assert that the remainder of the body was burnt to near-ashes, but this is scientifically doubtful. Additionally, according to a purported Soviet autopsy report, the alveolar process was missing from the charred maxilla of the body presumed to belong to Eva Braun.

== Gallery ==
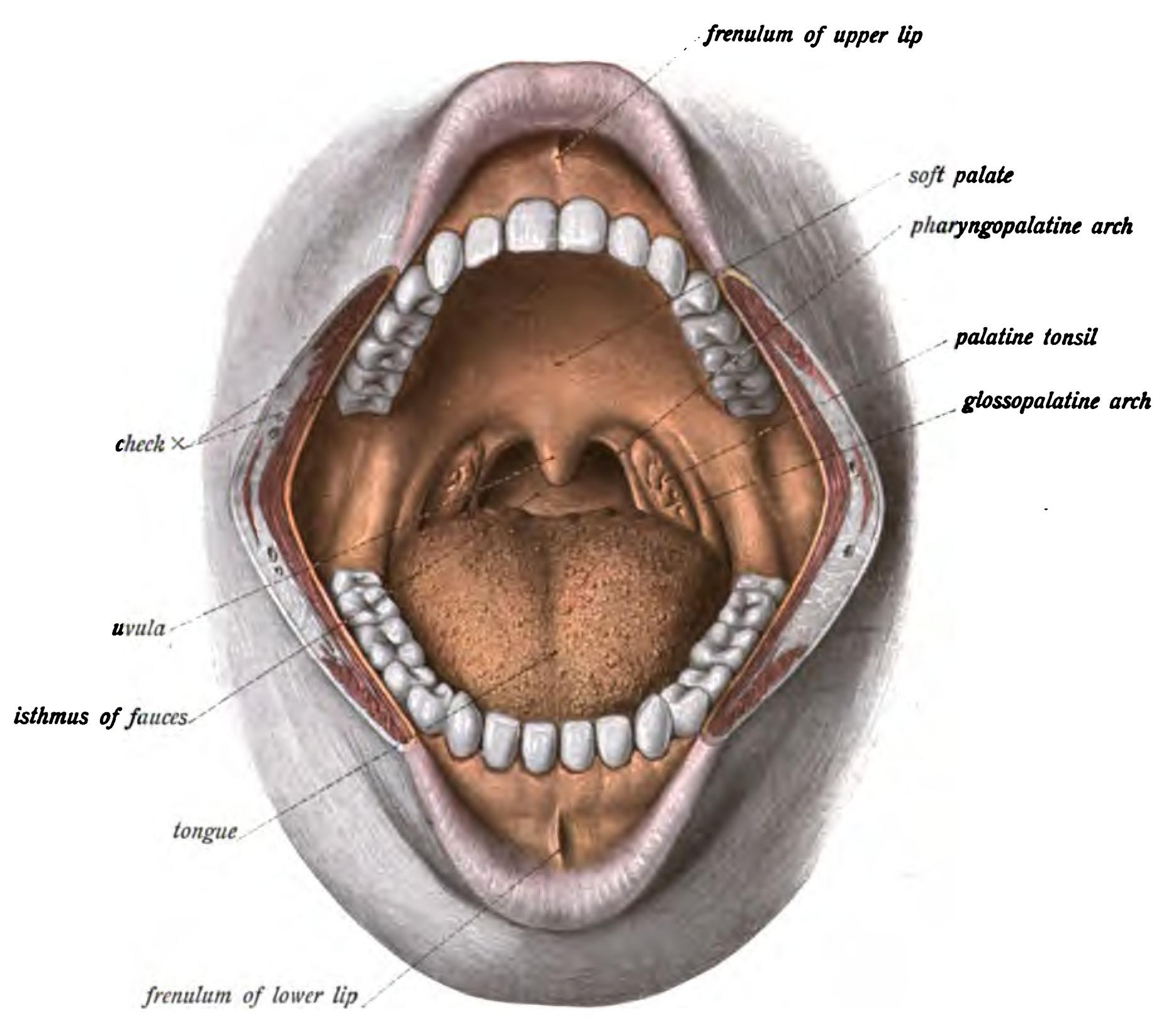
In the oral cavity, the alveolar processes are covered by gums.

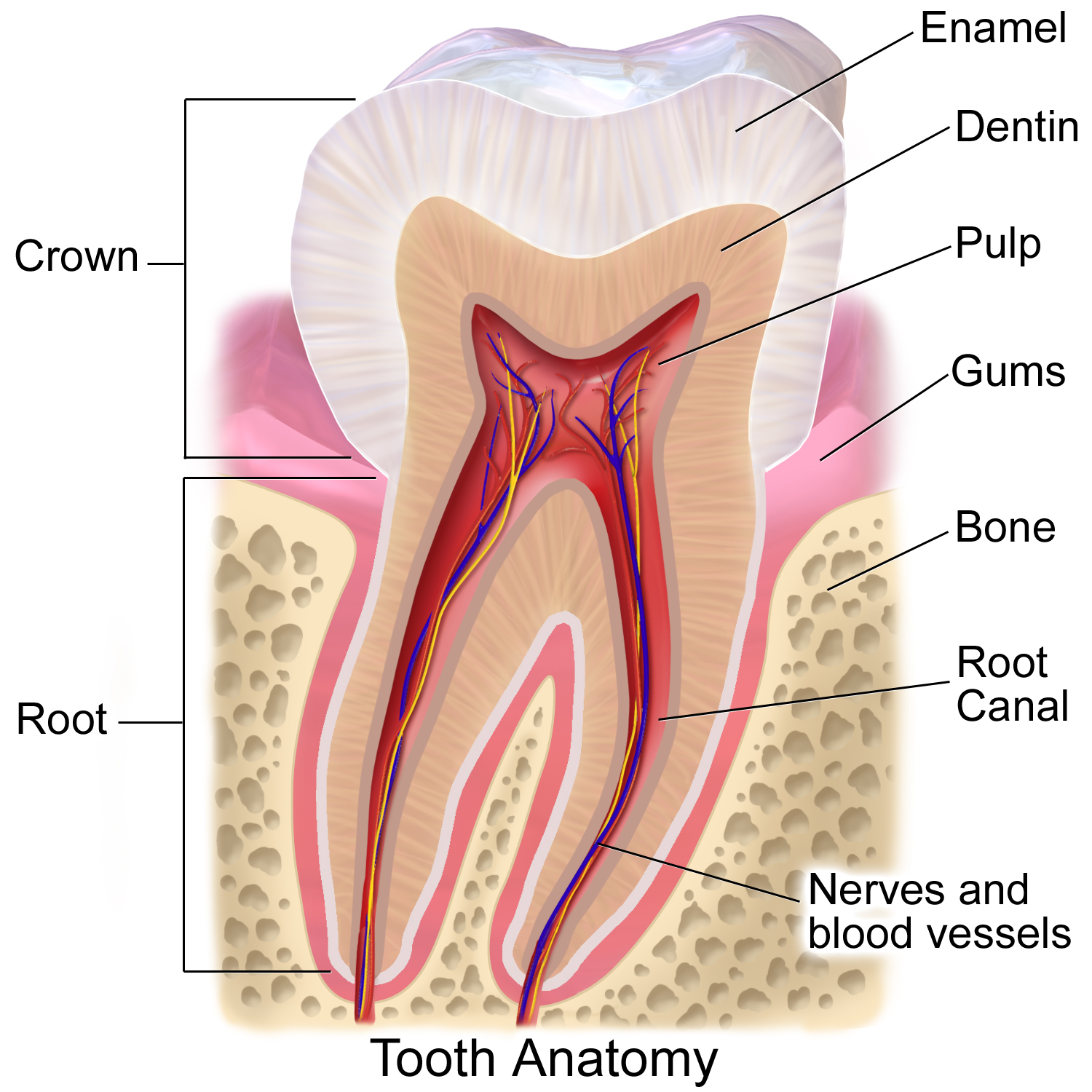
How the roots of the teeth, gums, and alveolar bone are related

3D animation showing placement of teeth in human skull

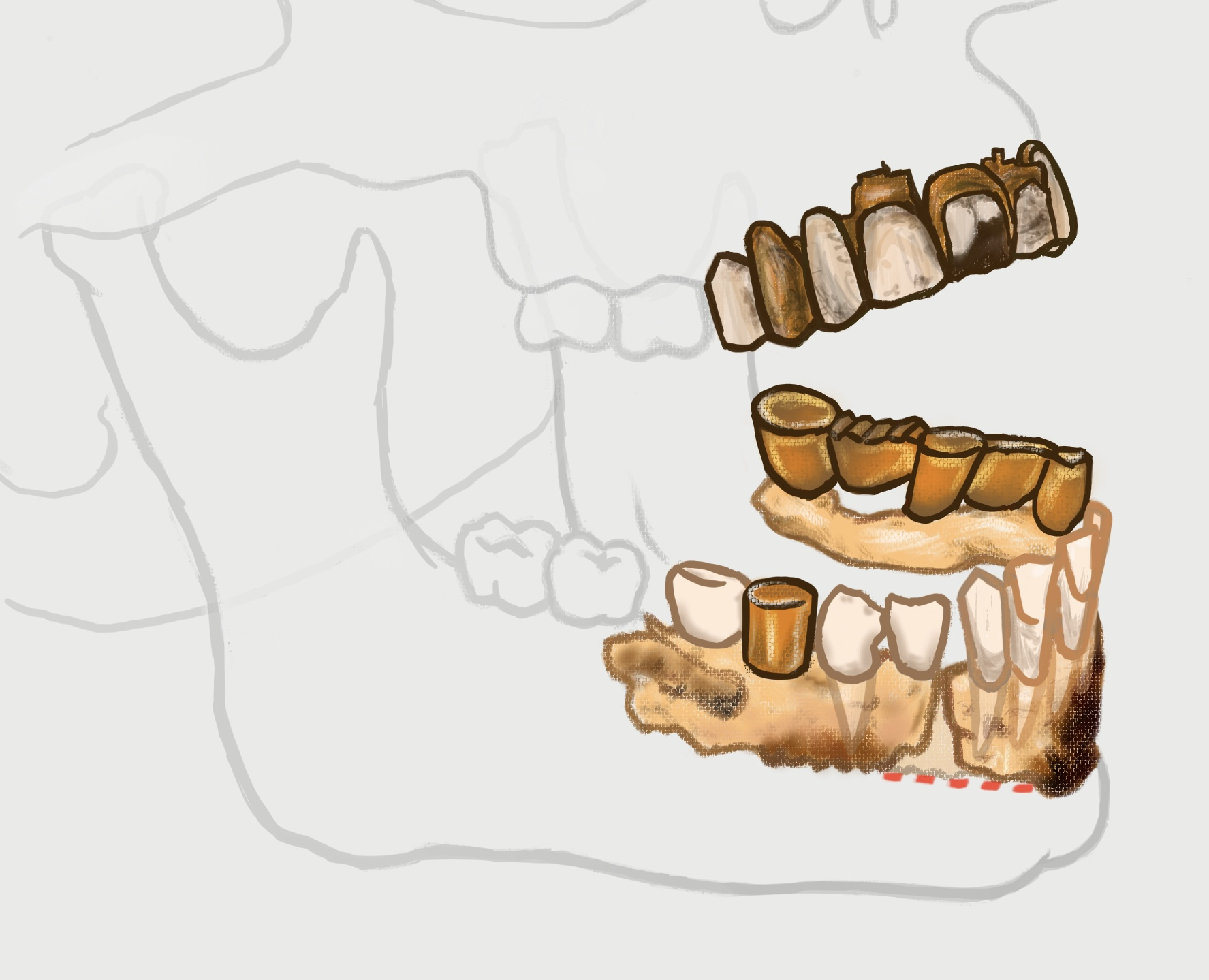
Hitler's mandibular remains were sundered at the alveolar process.

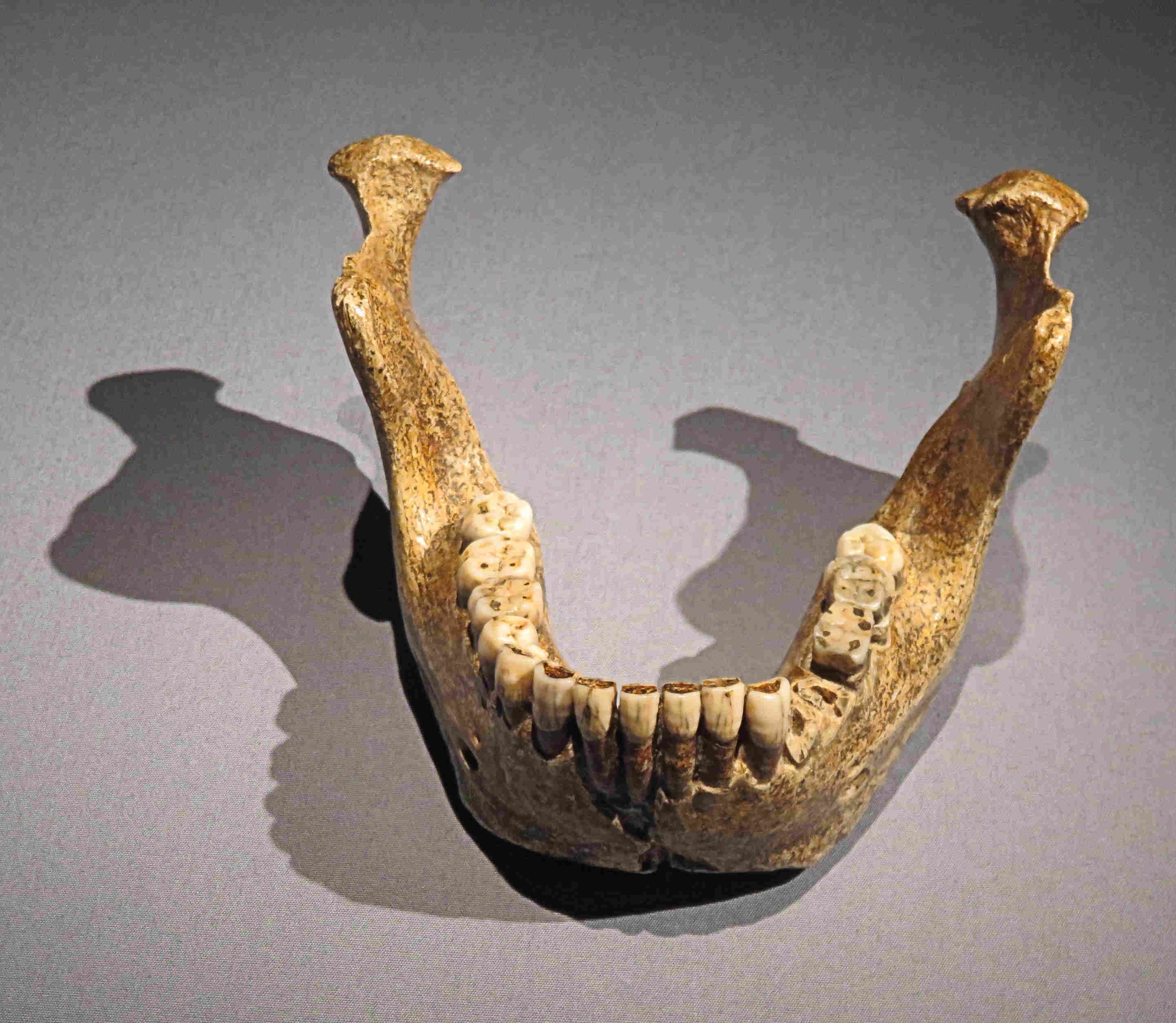
Eroded alveolar process of the archaic human Homo heidelbergensis
