= Cementoblast =

Details
- Location: Root of tooth
- Function: Cementogenesis

Identifiers
- Latin: cementoblastus
- FMA: 63002

A cementoblast is a biological cell that forms from the follicular cells around the root of a tooth, and whose biological function is cementogenesis, which is the formation of cementum (hard tissue that covers the tooth root). The mechanism of differentiation of the cementoblasts is controversial but circumstantial evidence suggests that an epithelium or epithelial component may cause dental sac cells to differentiate into cementoblasts, characterised by an increase in length. Other theories involve Hertwig epithelial root sheath (HERS) being involved.

Martha Somerman and her laboratory played a key role in identifying and characterizing cementoblasts, the cells responsible for forming cementum, a vital mineralized tissue covering tooth roots.

== Structure ==
Thus cementoblasts resemble bone-forming osteoblasts but differ functionally and histologically. The cells of cementum are the entrapped cementoblasts, the cementocytes. Each cementocyte lies in its lacuna (plural, lacunae), similar to the pattern noted in bone. These lacunae also have canaliculi or canals. Unlike those in bone, however, these canals in cementum do not contain nerves, nor do they radiate outward. Instead, the canals are oriented toward the periodontal ligament (PDL) and contain cementocytic processes that exist to diffuse nutrients from the ligament because it is vascularized. The progenitor cells also found in the PDL region contribute to the mineralization of the tissue.

Once in this situation, cementoblasts lose their secretory activity and become cementocytes. However, a layer of cementoblasts is always present along the outer covering of the PDL; these cells can then produce cementum if the tooth is injured (see hypercementosis).

== See also ==
- Cementum
- Cementogenesis
- Tooth development
- Cementoblastoma
- Enamel
- List of human cell types derived from the germ layers
- List of distinct cell types in the adult human body
