= Domenico Gagliardi =

Italian physician and anatomist

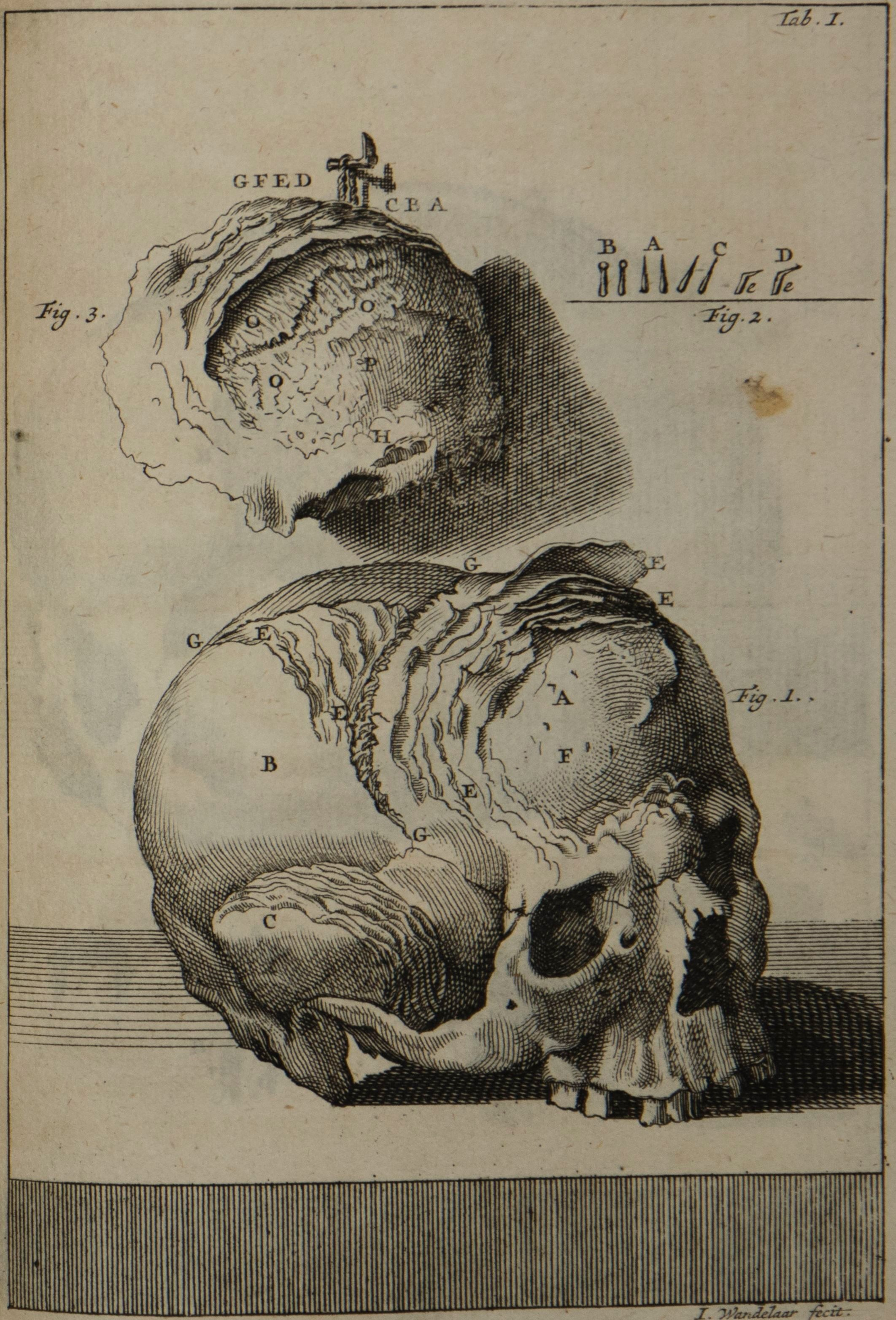
illustration of skull with layering of bone and the "bolts" holding the lamellae together

Domenico Gagliardi (c. 1660 – c. 1735) was an Italian physician and anatomist. He may have served as a professor of anatomy at Rome (but his name is not listed) and served as chief physician (protomedicus) to four Popes. He studied the structure of bones, dissolving the structures, and observing them under a microscope as described in his 1689 book Anatome ossium novis inventis illustrata.

== Life and work ==
Gagliardi was born in Marino, Papal States. Little is known about his early life but he studied medicine at Sapienza and began to conduct examinations of bones and teeth and published his findings in 1689 as Anatome ossium novis inventis illustrata. He compared the bones of humans and of animals, dissolved them in acids and various chemicals to examine fine structure, and commented also on the structure of teeth. He believed that teeth were similar to bones but with aligned fibres concreted by "juice". He noted that he could produce sparks by striking teeth together or against steel. He found that layers or lamellae of bone were in some places held by claviculi (nails or bolts) which perforate the lamellae and hold them together. These claviculi are more often referred to in modern literature as Sharpey's fibres. In 1722 he wrote on philosophy, morals, and health. Gagliardi served as chief physician to four Popes - Pope Alexander VIII (1610-1691), Pope Clement XI (1649-1721), Pope Benedict XIII (1649-1730) and Pope Benedict XIV (1675-1758).
