= Concrescence =

- Specialty: Dentistry

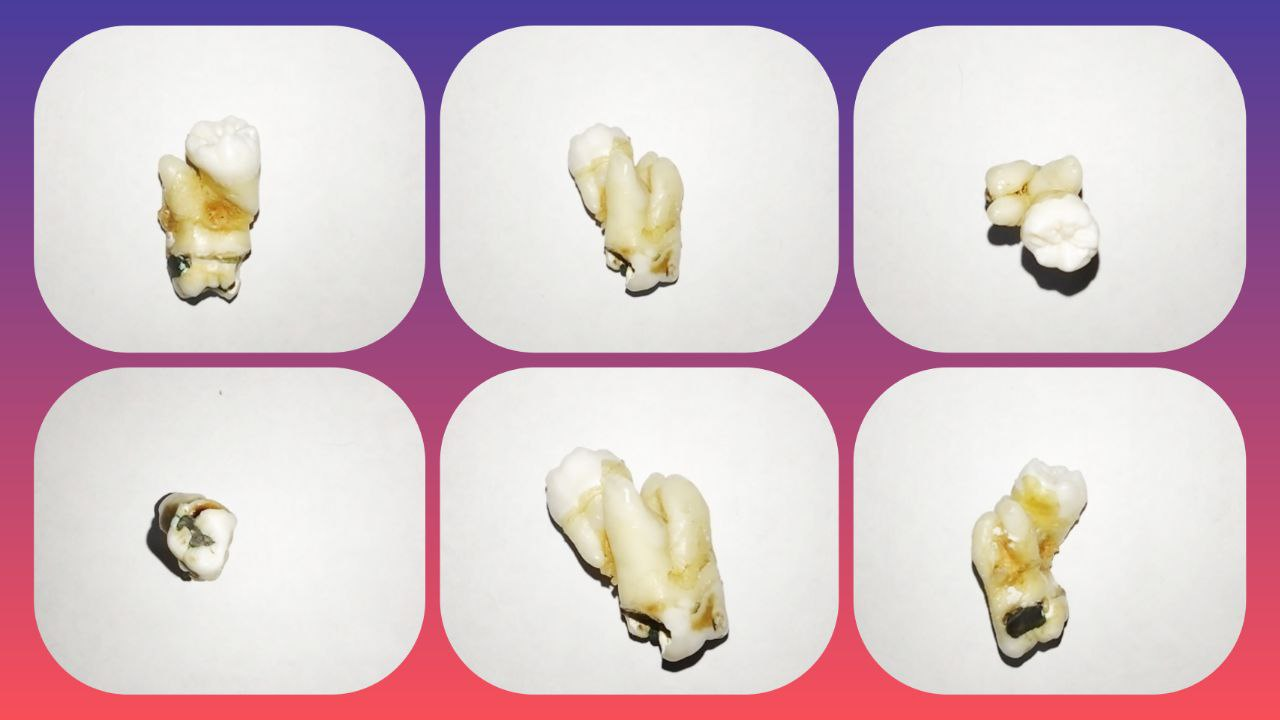
Dental concrescence between a 2M (erupted) and a higher 3M (retained)

Concrescence is an uncommon developmental condition of teeth where the cementum overlying the roots of at least two teeth fuse together without the involvement of dentin. Usually, two teeth are involved with the upper second and third molars being most commonly fused together. The prevalence ranges 0.04–0.8% in permanent teeth, with the incidence being highest in the posterior maxilla.

== Signs and symptoms ==
- Problems with tooth positioning causing cheek biting and traumatic ulcers.
- Involved teeth may have difficulty erupting or may not erupt completely.
- Possible gum disease (localized periodontal destruction due to aetiological factors, e.g. funnel development leading to plaque accumulation)
- Cavities (caries) due to predisposition from crowded teeth and misalignment.
- May cause fracture of the tuberosity or floor of the maxillary sinus.

== Cause ==
The exact cause of concrescence is unknown. However, it may develop during root formation (true/primary concrescence) or after root formation (acquired/secondary concrescence). Factors that may cause concrescence include injuries (trauma), crowding of teeth, inflammation, or infection. Concrescence appears to have no particular predisposition for age, gender, or ethnicity.

The postinflammatory pattern frequently involves carious molars in which the root ends (apices) overlie the roots of impacted third molars, most common with the distally angulated third molars. The resultant large pulpal exposure often permits pulpal drainage, leading to a resolution of a portion of the intrabony pathosis. Cemental repair then occurs.

== Diagnosis ==
Clinically, concrescence is difficult to diagnose due to lack of involvement of tooth enamel resulting in a tooth crown that appears normal. Radiographs taken at different angles can aid in the detection of concrescence, since the condition may be misdiagnosed as radiographic overlap of superimposed teeth. Radiographically, teeth appear joined together with the absence of periodontal ligament or interdental bone between them. Cone beam computed tomography (CBCT) may assist in diagnosis and treatment planning, but cannot provide a definitive diagnosis. Histological examination of extracted teeth is necessary to confirm the diagnosis and distinguishing concrescence from differential diagnoses of gemination or fusion by observing lack of dentinal confluence between fused teeth.

== Treatment ==
If the condition is not affecting the patient, no treatment is needed. Concrescence teeth could be reshaped and replaced with full crowns. If the teeth are having recurrent problems, are non-restorable, or are painful, tooth extraction should be considered to prevent further periodontal destruction leading to tooth loss. However, a consequence of extraction is that the conjoined tooth also must often be removed.

Post-inflammatory concrescence must be kept in mind whenever extraction is planned for non-vital teeth with apices that overlie the roots of an adjacent tooth. Significant difficulties with extraction can be experienced during removal of a tooth that is unexpectedly joined to its neighbor. Surgical separation often is required to complete the procedure without loss of a significant portion of the surrounding bone.

If the cemental union between affected teeth is slight, the teeth may separate during extraction of one of the teeth and may never be noticed. If the union is large or firm, the planned extraction of one of the teeth may inadvertently result in the removal of its mate. A clinician’s awareness of the characteristics of this odontogenic anomaly may help avert adverse outcomes in the treatment of concrescent teeth.
