= Nutrient resorption =

In plants, nutrient resorption is a process in which nutrients are withdrawn from senescing plant tissues. It acts as a nutrient conservation mechanism. It is influenced by several environmental and physiological processes.
