= Sharpey's fibres =

In anatomy, a type of connective tissue

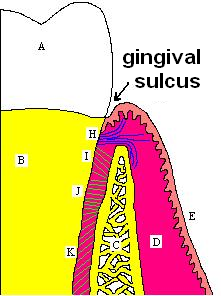
- A, crown of the tooth, covered by enamel. B, root of the tooth, covered by cementum. C, alveolar bone. D, subepithelial connective tissue. E, oral epithelium. F, free gingival margin. H, principle gingival fibres. I, alveolar crest fibres of the periodontal ligament (PDL). J, horizontal fibres of the PDL. K, oblique fibres of the PDL

Sharpey's fibres (bone fibres, or perforating fibres) are a matrix of connective tissue consisting of bundles of strong predominantly type I collagen fibres connecting periosteum to bone. They are part of the outer fibrous layer of periosteum, entering into the outer circumferential and interstitial lamellae of bone tissue.

Sharpey's fibres also attach muscle to the periosteum of bone by merging with the fibrous periosteum and underlying bone as well. A good example is the attachment of the rotator cuff muscles to the blade of the scapula.

In the teeth, Sharpey's fibres are the terminal ends of principal fibres (of the periodontal ligament) that insert into the cementum and into the periosteum of the alveolar bone. A study on rats suggests that the three-dimensional structure of Sharpey's fibres intensifies the continuity between the periodontal ligament fibre and the alveolar bone (tooth socket), and acts as a buffer medium against stress. Sharpey's fibres in the primary acellular cementum are mineralized fully; those in cellular cementum and bone are mineralized only partially at their periphery.

In the skull, the main function of Sharpey's fibres is to bind the cranial bones in a firm but moveable manner; they are most numerous in areas where the bones are subjected to the greatest forces of separation. In the spine, similar fibres join the intervertebral disc to the adjacent vertebrae. Each fibre is accompanied by an arteriole and one or more nerve fibres.

Scottish anatomist William Sharpey described them in 1846, although they were also referred to as the claviculi of Gagliardi after Domenico Gagliardi who described them in 1689.
