= Cementum =

Specialized calcified substance covering the root of a tooth

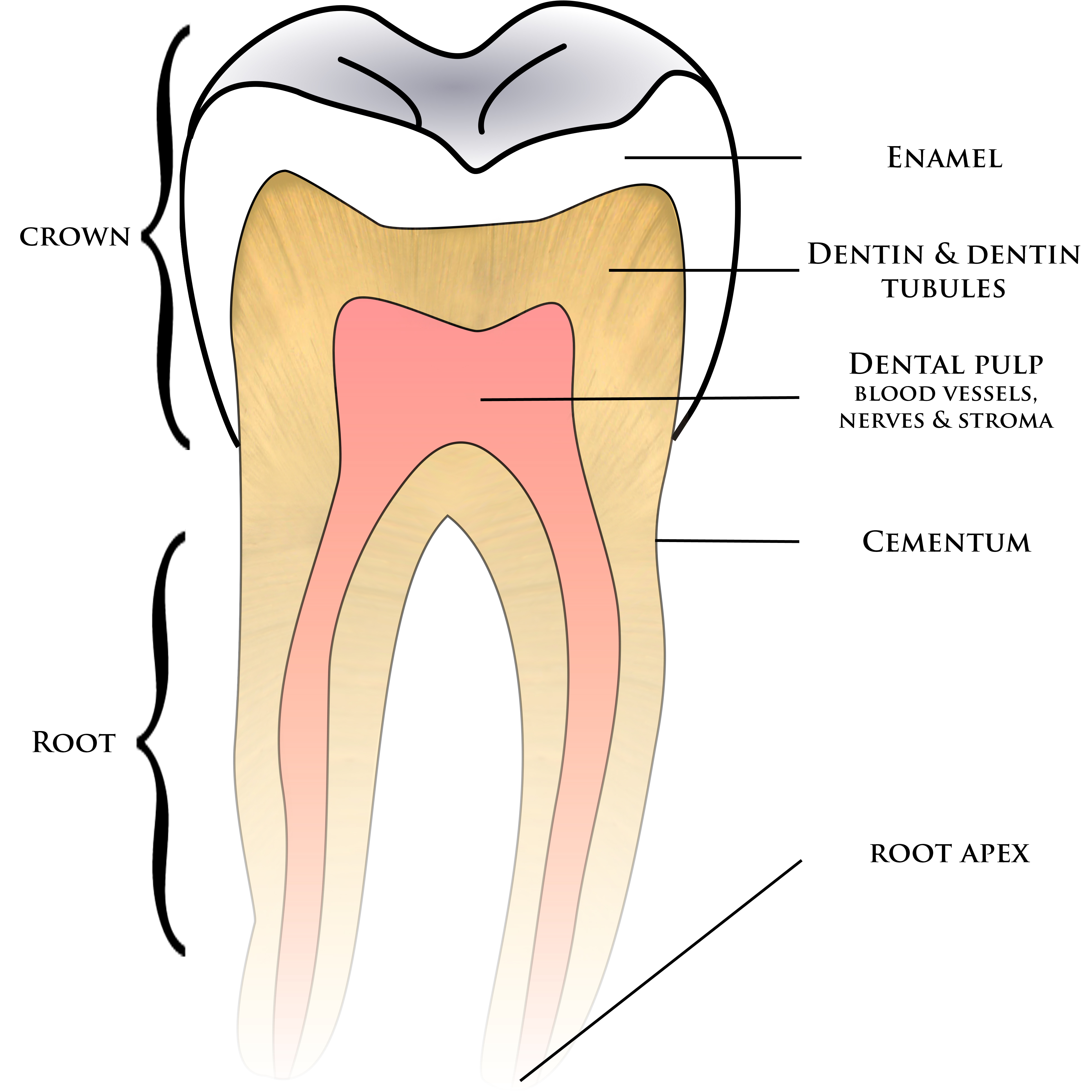
- Basic tooth anatomy, showing cementum

Details

Identifiers
- Latin: caementum
- MeSH: D003739
- TA98: A05.1.03.057; A03.1.03.007
- TA2: 1612
- FMA: 55630

Cementum is a specialized calcified substance covering the root of a tooth. The cementum is the part of the periodontium that attaches the teeth to the alveolar bone by anchoring the periodontal ligament.

== Structure ==
Cementum situated around a human molar

The cementum is the surface layer of the tooth root, covering the dentin (which is labeled B). Rather than being a passive entity like paint on a wall, cementum is a dynamic entity within the periodontium. It is attached to the alveolar bone (C) by the fibers of the periodontal ligament and to the soft tissue of the gingiva by the gingival fibers (H).

The cells of cementum are the entrapped cementoblasts, the cementocytes. Each cementocyte lies in its lacuna, similar to the pattern noted in bone. These lacunae also have canaliculi or canals. Unlike those in bone, however, these canals in cementum do not contain nerves, nor do they radiate outward. Instead, the canals are oriented toward the periodontal ligament and contain cementocytic processes that exist to diffuse nutrients from the ligament because it is vascularized.

After the apposition of cementum in layers, the cementoblasts that do not become entrapped in cementum line up along the cemental surface along the length of the outer covering of the periodontal ligament. These cementoblasts can form subsequent layers of cementum if the tooth is injured.

Sharpey fibers are part of the principal collagenous fibers of the periodontal ligament embedded in the cementum and alveolar bone to attach the tooth to the alveolus.

If cementum can be observed on teeth, it can imply that the roots are exposed, showing that the clinical crown (the exposed part of the tooth) is bigger than the anatomical crown (the surface of the tooth covered by enamel). This is often due to gingival recession and may be an indication of periodontal disease.

=== Cementoenamel junction ===
The cementum joins the enamel to form the cementoenamel junction (CEJ), which is referred to as the cervical line.

Three possible types of transitional interfaces may be present at the CEJ. The traditional view was that certain interfaces dominated in certain oral cavities. The CEJ may exhibit all of these interfaces in an individual's oral cavity, and there is even considerable variation when one tooth is traced circumferentially.

=== Dentinocemental junction ===
When the cementoid reaches the full thickness needed, the cementoid surrounding the cementocytes becomes mineralized, or matured, and is then considered cementum. The dentinocemental junction (DCJ) is formed because of the apposition of cementum over the dentin. This interface is not as defined, either clinically or histologically, as that of the dentinoenamel junction (DEJ), given that cementum and dentin are of common embryological background, unlike that of enamel and dentin.

The dentinocemental junction (DCJ) is a relatively smooth area in the permanent tooth, and attachment of cementum to the dentin is firm but not understood completely.

=== Types ===
The different categories of cementum are based on the presence or absence of cementocytes, as well as whether the collagen fibres are extrinsic or intrinsic. It is thought that fibroblasts, and some cementoblasts, secrete extrinsic fibres, but only cementoblasts secrete intrinsic fibres. The extrinsic fibres within acellular extrinsic fibre cementum, travel perpendicular to the surface of the root and allow the tooth to attach to the alveolar bone by the periodontal ligament (PDL), continuous with the cementodentinal junction (CDJ). Acellular cementum only contains extrinsic collagen fibres. Whereas, cellular cementum is quite thick and contains both extrinsic and intrinsic collagen fibres. The first cementum to be formed during tooth development is acellular extrinsic fibre cementum. The acellular layer of cementum is living tissue that does not incorporate cells into its structure and usually predominates on the coronal half of the root; cellular cementum occurs more frequently on the apical half. In summary, the main types of cementum are as follows: acellular afibrillar cementum (AAC), acellular extrinsic fibres cementum (AEFC), cellular intrinsic fibres cementum (CIFC) and mixed stratified cementum (MSC) which displays both cellular and acellular cementum.

Cellular cementum contains cells and is the medium of attachment of collagen fibres to the alveolar bone. It is also responsible for minor repair of any resorption by continued deposition to keep the attachment apparatus intact. Acellular cementum does not contain cells and has a main purpose of adaptive function.

=== Composition ===
Cementum is slightly softer than dentin and consists of about 45% to 50% inorganic material (hydroxylapatite) by weight and 50% to 55% organic matter and water by weight. The organic portion is composed primarily of collagen and proteoglycans. Cementum is avascular, receiving its nutrition through its own imbedded cells from the surrounding vascular periodontal ligament.

The cementum is light yellow and slightly lighter in color than dentin. It has the highest fluoride content of all mineralized tissue. Cementum also is permeable to a variety of materials. It is formed continuously throughout life because a new layer of cementum is deposited to keep the attachment intact as the superficial layer of cementum ages. Cementum on the root ends surrounds the apical foramen and may extend slightly onto the inner wall of the pulp canal.

=== Development ===
Cementum is secreted by cells called cementoblasts within the root of the tooth and is thickest at the root apex (the end of the root where the nerves and blood vessels enter the tooth). These cementoblasts develop from undifferentiated mesenchymal cells in the connective tissue of the dental follicle or sac. Cementoblasts produces cementum in a rhythmic manner on intervals indicating periods of activity and periods of rest, producing so-called incremental lines of Salter. Incremental lines of Salter are the only incremental lines in the tooth that are hypercalcified, because there is a much smaller organic portion (collagen fibers) than inorganic portion (hydroxyapatite crystals) of cementum, so when the cementoblasts rest they leave a space for the inorganic portion. Conversely, in enamel ameloblasts (incremental lines of Retzius) and dentin odontoblasts (incremental lines of von Ebner), the inorganic portion is much greater than the organic portion, so when ameloblasts and odontoblasts rest, they leave a space for the organic portion and become hypocalcified.

Unlike ameloblasts and odontoblasts, which leave no cellular bodies in their secreted products, during the later steps within the stage of apposition, many of the cementoblasts become entrapped by the cementum they produce, becoming cementocytes. Thus again, cementum is more similar to alveolar bone, with its osteoblasts becoming entrapped osteocytes.

Cementum is capable of repairing itself to a limited degree, but cannot regenerate. It is not resorbed under normal conditions.

== Clinical significance ==
- Some root resorption of the apical portion of the root may occur if orthodontic pressures are excessive and movement is too fast. Some experts also agree on a third type of cementum, afibrillar cementum, which sometimes extends onto the enamel of the tooth.
- The excessive buildup of cementum on the roots of a tooth is a pathological condition known as hypercementosis. Cementum thickness can increase on the root end to compensate for attritional wear of the occlusal/incisal surface and passive eruption of the tooth.
- When cementum is exposed through gingival recession, it quickly undergoes abrasion by mechanical friction because of its low mineral content and thinness. The exposure of the deeper dentin can lead to problems such as extrinsic staining and dentinal hypersensitivity.
- The incidence of cemental caries increases in older adults as gingival decline occurs from either trauma or periodontal illness. It is a chronic condition that forms a large, shallow lesion and slowly invades first the root's cementum and then dentin to cause a chronic infection of the pulp. Because dental pain is a late finding, many lesions are not detected early, resulting in restorative obstacles and increased tooth loss.
- Cementicles are small, spherical or ovoid calcified masses embedded within or attached to the cementum layer on the root surface of a tooth, or lying free within the periodontal ligament
- Cemental spurs can be found at or near the CEJ. These are symmetrical spheres of cementum attached to the cemental root surface, similar to enamel pearls. Cemental spurs result from irregular deposition of cementum on the root. They can present some clinical problems in differentiation from calculus and may be noted on radiographs; yet, because they are hard dental tissue, they are not easily removed, and thus may also interfere with periodontal treatment.

=== DNA studies ===
A 2010 archeological study has found that cementum has five times the amount of mitochondrial DNA compared to dentin, which is commonly sampled. Teeth are increasingly utilized as a source of nuclear DNA to aid identification of human remains. DNA extraction and the results of genetic analysis from the tissue are extremely variable and to some extent unpredictable. However, the quantity of DNA available in dentin is affected by age and dental disease, whereas that in cementum is not.

== See also ==
- Tooth development – Process by which teeth form and grow into the mouth
- Dentin – Calcified tissue of the body; one of the four major components of teeth
- Periodontal ligament – Group of specialized connective tissue fibers
- Periodontium – Tissues surrounding the teeth
- Cementoma – Odontogenic tumor of cementum
- Hypercementosis – Excessive buildup of normal cementum on the roots of teeth
