= Periodontium =

Tissues surrounding the teeth

- The tissues of the periodontium combine to form an active, dynamic group of tissues. The alveolar bone (C) is surrounded for the most part by the subepithelial connective tissue of the gingiva, which in turn is covered by the various characteristic gingival epithelia. The cementum overlaying the tooth root is attached to the adjacent cortical surface of the alveolar bone by the alveolar crest (I), horizontal (J) and oblique (K) fibers of the periodontal ligament.

Details

Identifiers
- Latin: periodontium
- MeSH: D010519
- TA98: A05.1.03.058; A03.1.03.002
- TA2: 2819

The periodontium (from Greek περί (peri-) 'around' and -odont 'tooth') is the specialized tissues that both surround and support the teeth, maintaining them in the maxillary and mandibular bones. Periodontics is the dental specialty that relates specifically to the care and maintenance of these tissues. It provides the support necessary to maintain teeth in function. It consists of four principal components, namely:

- Gingiva (the gums)
- Periodontal ligament (PDL)
- Cementum
- Alveolar bone proper

Each of these components is distinct in location, architecture, and biochemical properties, which adapt during the life of the structure. For example, as teeth respond to forces or migrate medially, bone resorbs on the pressure side and is added on the tension side. Cementum similarly adapts to wear on the occlusal surfaces of the teeth by apical deposition. The periodontal ligament in itself is an area of high turnover that allows the tooth not only to be suspended in the alveolar bone but also to respond to the forces. Thus, although seemingly static and having functions of their own, all of these components function as a single unit. The Wnt signaling antagonist Sfrp3/Frzb has been recently discovered as an early developmental marker of the periodontium.

== External forces and the periodontium ==
The periodontium exists for the purpose of supporting teeth during their function and it depends on the stimulation it receives from the function for preservation of its structure. Therefore, a constant state of balance always exists between the periodontal structures and the external forces.

Alveolar bone undergoes constant physiologic remodeling in response to external forces, particularly occlusal forces. Bone is removed from areas where it is no longer needed and added to areas where it is needed. The socket wall reflects the responsiveness to the external forces. Osteoblasts and newly formed osteoid line the areas of tension, whereas lines of compression are lined by osteoclasts. The forces also influence the number, density, and alignment of trabeculae inside the bone. The bony trabeculae are aligned in the path of tensile and compressive stresses to provide maximum resistance to occlusal forces with a minimum of bone substance. When forces are increased, the bony trabeculae also increase in number and thickness and bone is added to the external surfaces.

The periodontal ligament depends on stimulation provided by function to preserve its structure. Within physiologic limits the PDL can accommodate increased function by increasing its width. Forces that exceed the adaptive capacity of the periodontium produce injury called trauma from occlusion. When occlusal forces are reduced the PDL atrophies, appearing thinned. This phenomenon is called disuse atrophy.
