= Periodontal fiber =

Group of specialized connective tissue fibers

Periodontal ligament
- The tissues of the periodontium combine to form an active, dynamic group of tissues. The alveolar bone (C) is surrounded for the most part by the subepithelial connective tissue of the gingiva, which in turn is covered by the various characteristic gingival epithelia. The cementum overlaying the tooth root is attached to the adjacent cortical surface of the alveolar bone by the alveolar crest (I), horizontal (J) and oblique (K) fibers of the periodontal ligament.

Details
- Precursor: Dental follicle

Identifiers
- Latin: fibra periodontalis
- Acronym: PDL
- MeSH: D010513
- TA2: 1611
- FMA: 56665

The periodontal ligament, commonly abbreviated as the PDL, are a group of specialized connective tissue fibers that essentially attach a tooth to the alveolar bone within which they sit. It inserts into root cementum on one side and onto alveolar bone on the other.

== Structure ==
The PDL consists of principal fibers, loose connective tissue, blast and clast cells, oxytalan fibers and cell rest of Malassez.

== Alveolodental ligament ==
The main principal fiber group is the alveolodental ligament, which consists of five fiber subgroups: alveolar crest, horizontal, oblique, apical, and interradicular on multirooted teeth. Principal fibers other than the alveolodental ligament are the transseptal fibers.

All these fibers help the tooth withstand the naturally substantial compressive forces that occur during chewing and remain embedded in the bone. The ends of the principal fibers that are within either cementum or alveolar bone proper are considered Sharpey fibers.

- Alveolar crest fibers (I) run from the cervical part of the root to the alveolar bone crest.
- Horizontal fibers (J) attach to the cementum apical to the alveolar crest fibers and run perpendicularly from the root of the tooth to the alveolar bone.
- Oblique fibers (K) are the most numerous fibers in the periodontal ligament, running from cementum in an oblique direction to insert into bone coronally. These fibers resist vertical and intrusive forces.
- Apical fibers are found radiating from cementum around the apex of the root to the bone, forming base of the socket or alveolus.
- Interradicular fibers are only found between the roots of multirooted teeth, such as premolars and molars. They extend from radicular cementum to interradicular alveolar bone.

=== Transseptal fibers ===
Transseptal fibers (H) extend interproximally over the alveolar bone crest and are embedded in the cementum of adjacent teeth; they form an interdental ligament. These fibers keep all the teeth aligned. These fibers may be considered as belonging to the gingival tissue because they do not have an osseous attachment. These fibers are consistent and are reconstructed even after the destruction of alveolar bone.

=== Loose connective tissue ===
Loose connective tissue contains fibers, extracellular matrix, cells, nerves and blood vessels. The extracellular compartment consists of Type 1, 3, and 5 collagen fibers bundles embedded in intercellular substance. The PDL collagen fibers are categorized according to their orientation and location along the tooth. The cells include fibroblast, defence cells and undifferentiated mesenchymal cells.

=== Cell rest of Malassez ===
These groups of epithelial cells become located in the mature PDL after the disintegration of Hertwig epithelial root sheath during the formation of the root. They form a plexus that surrounds the tooth. Cell rests of Malassez might proliferate during inflammation which may lead to radicular cyst formation in later life.

=== Oxytalan fibers ===
Oxytalan fibers are unique to the PDL and are elastic in nature. It inserts into cementum and runs in two directions: parallel to root surface and oblique to root surface. The function is thought to maintain the patency of blood vessels during occlusal loading. Further research is needed to determine the function of oxytalan fibers.

== Composition ==
The PDL substance has been estimated to be 70% water, which is thought to have a significant effect on the tooth's ability to withstand stress loads. The completeness and vitality of the PDL are essential for the functioning of the tooth.

The PDL ranges in width from 0.15 to 0.38mm with its thinnest part located in the middle third of the root. The width progressively decreases with age.

The PDL is a part of the periodontium that provides for the attachment of the teeth to the surrounding alveolar bone by way of the cementum.

The PDL appears as the periodontal space of 0.4 to 1.5 mm on radiographs, a radiolucent area between the radiopaque lamina dura of the alveolar bone proper and the radiopaque cementum.

== Development ==
PDL cells are one of the many cells derived from the dental follicle and this occurs after crown formation is completed and when the roots start developing. These cells will remodel the dental follicle to form the PDL. Formation of PDL will start at the cementoenamel junction and proceeds in an apical direction.

=== Effects of mechanical forces ===
Movement of teeth is determined by two factors: deposition of bone on the tension side and resorption of the bone on the compression side of the periodontal ligament (PDL). During this movement, bone remodelling is initiated by the PDL in which forces are transmitted from the tooth to the alveolar bone. Fibroblasts of the PDL will react to mechanical stress, therefore affecting osteoblastogenesis and osteoclastogenesis of the cells. When mechanical stimuli are introduced to the cells, osteocytes in the PDL will differentiate into osteoclasts which will then reform and remodel the bone structure in the affected area. For example, orthodontic treatment involves application of a mechanical force on to the teeth to align them and this is done through this complex combination of physical and cellular processes.

== Function ==
Functions of PDL are supportive, sensory, nutritive, and remodelling.

=== Support ===
The PDL is a part of the periodontium that provides for the attachment of the teeth to the surrounding alveolar bone by way of the cementum. PDL fibres also provide a role in load transfer between the teeth and alveolar bone. (PDL fibers absorb and transmit forces between teeth and alveolar bone. It acts as an effective support during the masticatory function.)

=== Sensory ===
PDL is heavily innervated; it involves mechanoreception, nociception and reflexes. Periodontal mechanoreceptors are present in PDL. They will transmit information about the stimulated tooth, direction and amplitude of forces.

=== Nutritive ===
It maintains the vitality of the surrounding cells. (PDL is heavily anastomosed). There are three principal sources of blood vessels which are apical vessels, perforating vessels and gingival vessels. Apical vessels originate from vessels that supply the pulp. Perforating vessels originate from lamina dura and the vessels perforate the socket wall (cribriform plate). Gingival vessels are derived from the gingival tissue. Outer layers of blood supply in PDL may help in mechanical suspension and support of the tooth while inner layers of blood vessels supply surrounding PDL tissues.

=== Remodeling ===
There are progenitor cells in the periodontal ligament that can differentiate into osteoblasts for the physiological maintenance of alveolar bone and, most likely, for its repair as well.

== Clinical significance ==
=== Injury ===
- When traumatic forces of occlusion are placed on a tooth, the PDL widens to take the extra forces. Thus, early occlusal trauma can be viewed on radiographs as a widening of the periodontal ligament space. Thickening of the lamina dura in response is also possible. Clinically, occlusal trauma is noted by the late manifestation of increased mobility of the tooth and possibly the presence of pathological tooth migration.
- Damage to the PDL may result in tooth ankylosis to the jawbone, making the tooth lose its continuous eruption ability. Dental trauma, such as subluxation, may cause tearing of the PDL and pain during function (eating).
- The PDL cells of an avulsed tooth are at risk of drying and desiccation if left in dry storage. Wet storage in an isotonic liquid, although a superior method to dry storage, can preserve PDL vitality depending on the medium but not for an indefinite period of time. All of these can lead to loss of vitality of the PDL and depending on the duration of storage, this can affect the success of subsequent replantation.

=== Disease ===
- The epithelial rests of Malassez can become cystic, usually forming nondiagnostic, radiolucent apical lesions that can be seen on radiographs. This occurs as a result of chronic periapical inflammation after pulpitis occurs and must be surgically removed.
- The PDL also undergoes drastic changes with chronic periodontal disease that involves the deeper structures of the periodontium with periodontitis. The fibers of the PDL become disorganized, and their attachments to either the alveolar bone proper or cementum through Sharpey fibers are lost because of the resorption of these two hard dental tissue.
- Pathological damaged or diseased PDL can result in delayed healing of the alveolar socket in cases where the diseased tooth is ultimately extracted.

=== Effect of tobacco smoking and nicotine ===
There is a relationship between smoking tobacco and periodontal disease, wound healing and oral cancers.

Nicotine, the major pharmacologically active ingredient in tobacco smoke, lessens a host's ability to defend against bacterial invasion induced by plaque. It is also the ingredient responsible for addiction.

Tobacco smoking impairs phagocytic and chemotactic activities of leukocytes and impedes wound healing, specifically by affecting gingival blood flow.

Cigarette smokers are more likely to experience destruction of the alveolar bone and periodontal ligament and are at a higher risk of developing periodontal disease.

Nicotine and lipopolysaccharides synergistically induce the production of nitric oxide (NO) and PGE2, and increase inducible nitric oxide synthase (iNOS) and COX-2 expression in human periodontal ligament (hPDL) cells.

At the cellular level, nicotine reduces the proliferation of red blood cells, macrophages, and fibroblasts and increases platelet adhesiveness.

Macroscopically, this affects healing and tissue perfusion due to micro clot formation in the blood vessels. Nicotine also has a sympathomimetic action, stimulating epinephrine and norepinephrine release, which causes vasoconstriction and limits tissue perfusion. Nicotine jeopardises bone formation by inhibiting neovascularization and osteoblastic differentiation.

=== Ankylosis ===
Ankylosis is a condition where the cementum of the tooth's root fuses with the bone that is around the tooth. The osseous tissue replaces the periodontal ligament which causes the tooth to be fixed and cannot undergo eruptive change. Ankylosis usually occurs in primary molars; however, it can also take place in other primary teeth, as well as secondary dentition. Ankylosis is common in the anterior tooth after trauma and can be referred to as replacement resorption. In this process PDL cells are destroyed and as a result the cells of the alveolar bone will perform most of the healing. Radiographic examination of a patient with ankylosis may also reveal a loss of the PDL and bony bridging.

=== Effect of nutrition ===
Nutritional status of an individual can be a crucial factor in the progression and healing of periodontal tissues. The relationship between oral health and systemic health has become an increasingly important subject. Studies have suggested that vitamins D and C in particular have a certain grade of relationship with periodontal health. However, the supplementation of vitamins is not enough to reverse the periodontium to a healthy state and that further research is needed to confirm theories.

For example, scurvy is a disease resulting from a severe deficiency of vitamin C (ascorbic acid). Vitamin C is essential for the synthesis of collagen fibers.

== See also ==
- Periodontium
- Periodontal disease
- Cementum
- Alveolar bone
