= Nankali post system =

The Nankali post system is a post and cores prosthesis, which is used in prosthodontology and dental restoration. This post and core consists of a single smooth or serrated post and core which has an additional circle ring (counter sink) around it.

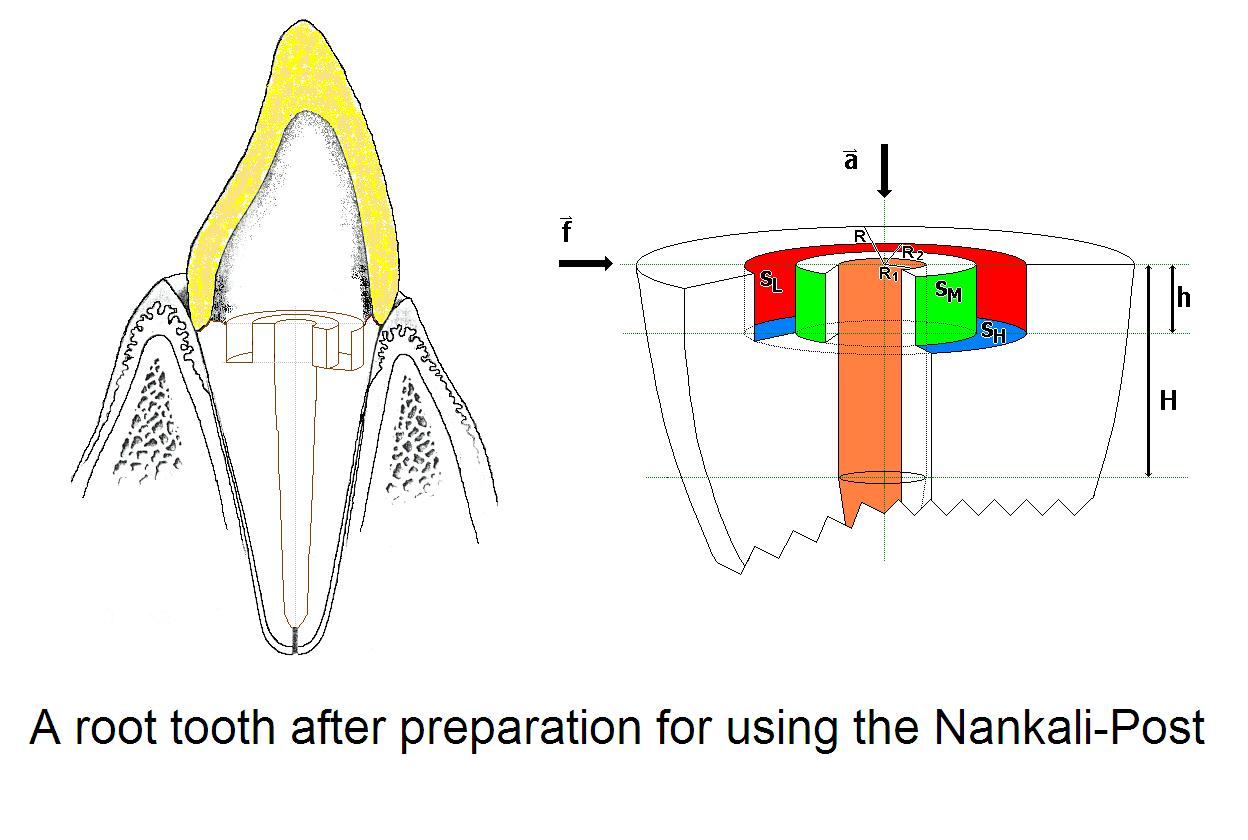
Nankali-post System.

The additional single-circle ring increases the contact surface area between the core and involved part of tooth significantly. Increased contact surface area decreases the pressure between the two objects (remaining part of the tooth and post-core) and is followed by a declining in the number of failures in treatments.

== General indications ==
The main indications are:

- Severely damaged crown
- Trauma
- Tooth wear (erosion)
- Hypoplastic conditions
- As part of another restoration
- Combined indication
- Non-vital teeth

== Disadvantages ==
The disadvantages are as follows:

- Requires an exact casting ( an exact cast post-core is required to get the highest result, particularly, when the depth of prepared canal is less than 50% of the root length),
- A specific bur is required,
- Increases plaque accumulation and changes in composition,
- Damage to soft tissues and remaining teeth, due to either poor denture design or lack of patient care,

== Fractured teeth ==
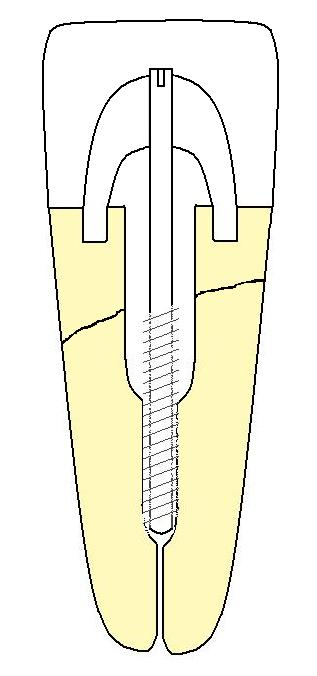
Schema of using the Nankali Post System for a horizontal root fractured tooth.

The post is suitable for those types of fractures in which the fracture line passes apical to the crown. In the first stage it is necessary to examine the patient in order to be sure that there is no sign of any fracture in the mandible or maxilla, then analyse the possibility of treatment of the fractured tooth canal. In addition, the condition of the tooth for using the bur requires to be checked as well.

== Bur ==
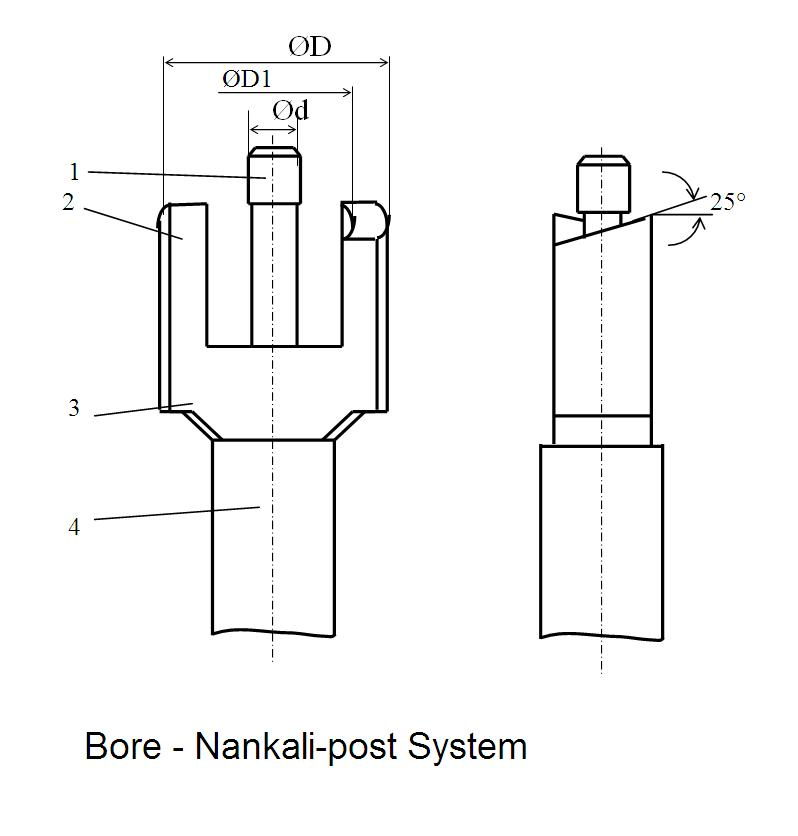
Schema of the bur of Nankali-post System. 1-Head, 2-cutter, 3-Body, 4-Holder

The designed bur for treating teeth is a bur consisting of a central guider and two symmetrical cutter to produce a single-circle ring. This bur is used after preparation of the root canal similar to other posts.

The two main advantages of this bore are speed in preparation root canals and its accuracy. The bur is designed in different sizes, which make it available for using in treatment of various teeth. The depth of the prepared ring is in direct proportion with the size of bore.

One of the major problems of using this post system is its bur, which means without having the bur it is impossible to use it.

== History ==
The Nankali-post was designed in 1997 in the National Medical University at the Orthopedic and Implant Stomatology Department by Dr. Ali Nankali, which (October 1999) verified by Scientific Board of Bogomolets National Medical University and international patent organization (УДК; 616.314-76-77:616.314.11-74:678.029.46:612.311) in Kyiv/Ukraine.

Initially it was presented at the 54Th Medical Science Conference of Students & Young Scientists in 1999, that was organized by Ukraine Health Ministry and National Medical University known as O.O. Bogomolets and Society Science Students known as O.O. Kisilia. The result of presentation was published in "Young Scientists and Students / Scientific Medical Seminar in 1999".

In 1999 it was requested for the patent (УДК; 616.314-76-77:616.314.11-74:678.029.46:612.311)and became a part of research of the Orthopedic and Implant Stomatology Department of the National Medical University. This new modified post-core was under study till 2004 and then attested by the Dental Scientific Board of Ukraine.

During the four years of careful observation (2000-2004 / National Medical University in Kyiv), the number of reported complication from patient, whom were treated with the Nankali-post was none.

Initially the bur and cast post-core were manufactured in the laboratory of the Orthopedic and Implant Stomatology Department of the National Medical University (O.O.Bogomolets) in Kyiv.

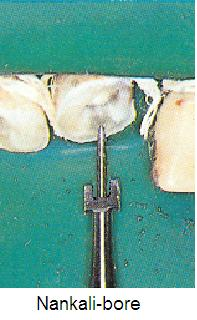
The image of first Bur, which was used for treatment teeth by the Nankali-post System.
