= Crownlay =

A crownlay is a type of dental restoration.

== Description ==
A crownlay is a hybrid dental restoration typically placed over an endodontically treated tooth that is more conservative than a normal full coverage crown, but less conservative than a normal onlay. Crownlays incorporate an extension of extra restorative material on the underside of the restoration into the excavated pulp chamber following root canal therapy, taking advantage of the extra surface area afforded in this space on the interior aspect of the preparation, thereby sparing the external walls from needing as much tooth reduction. The use of a crownlay results in the conservation of more healthy, natural tooth structure than is otherwise possible.

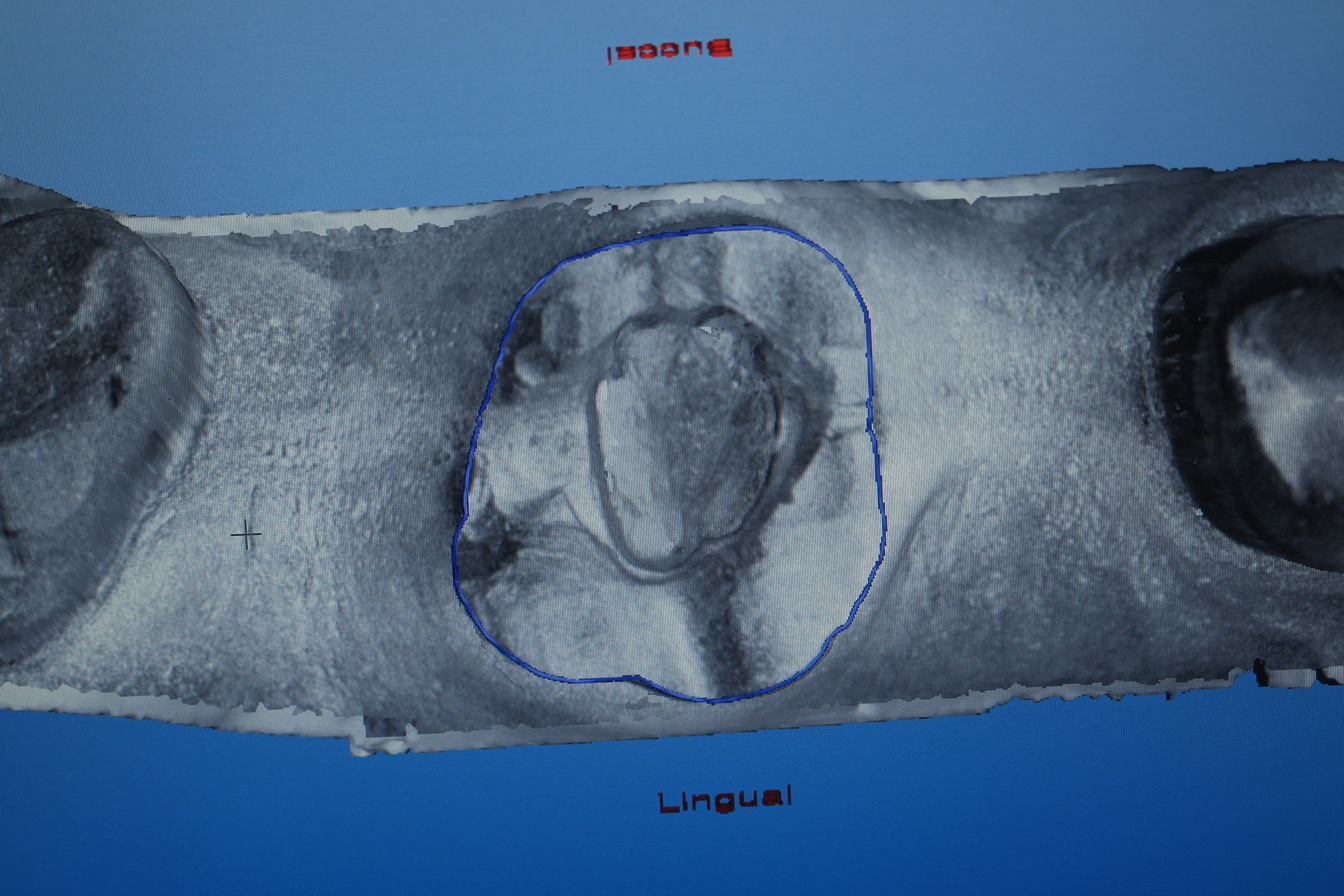
2009-03-31T15:01:33
Root canal treated molar prepared for CAD/CAM crownlay

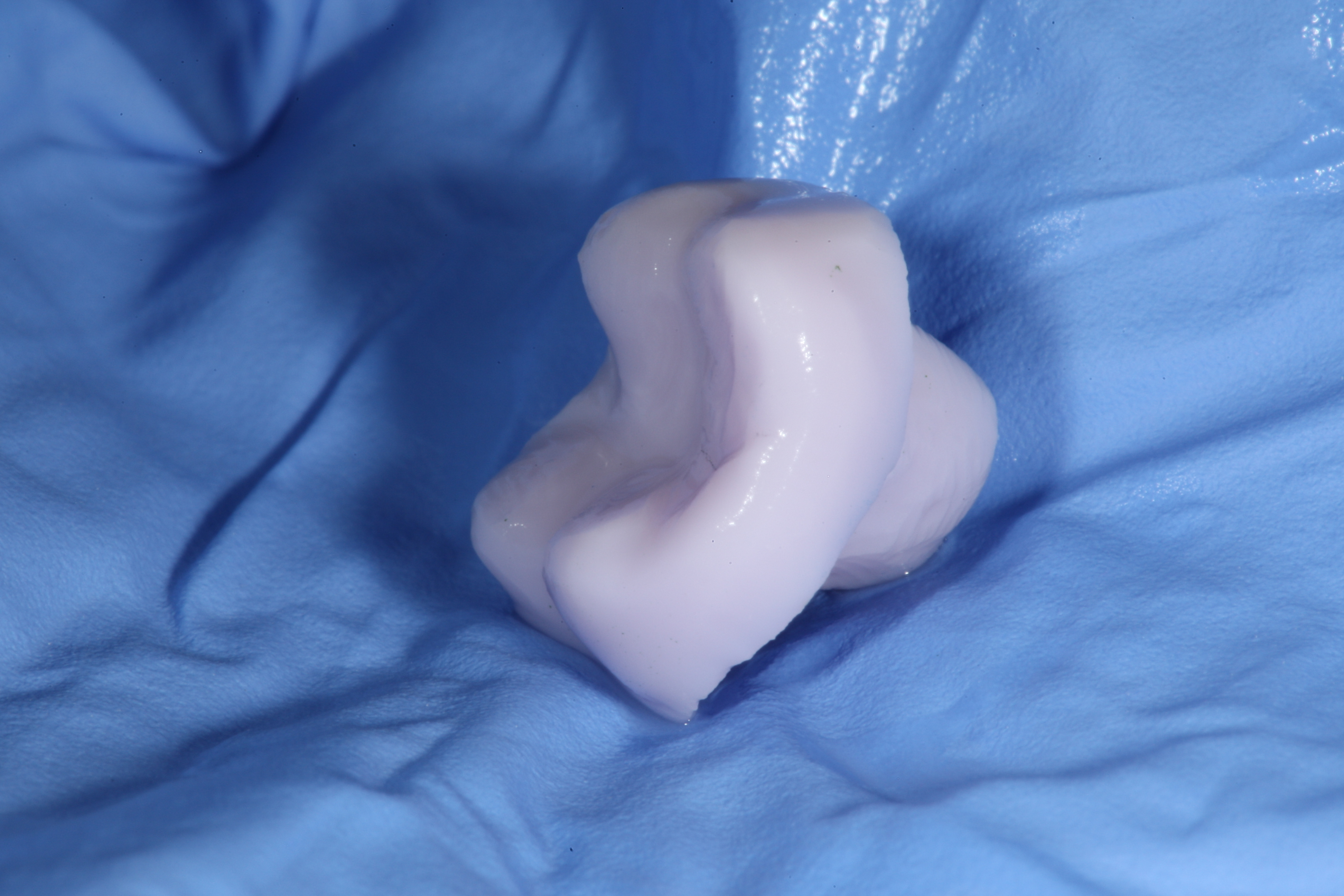
2009-03-31T15:39:56
crownlay milled

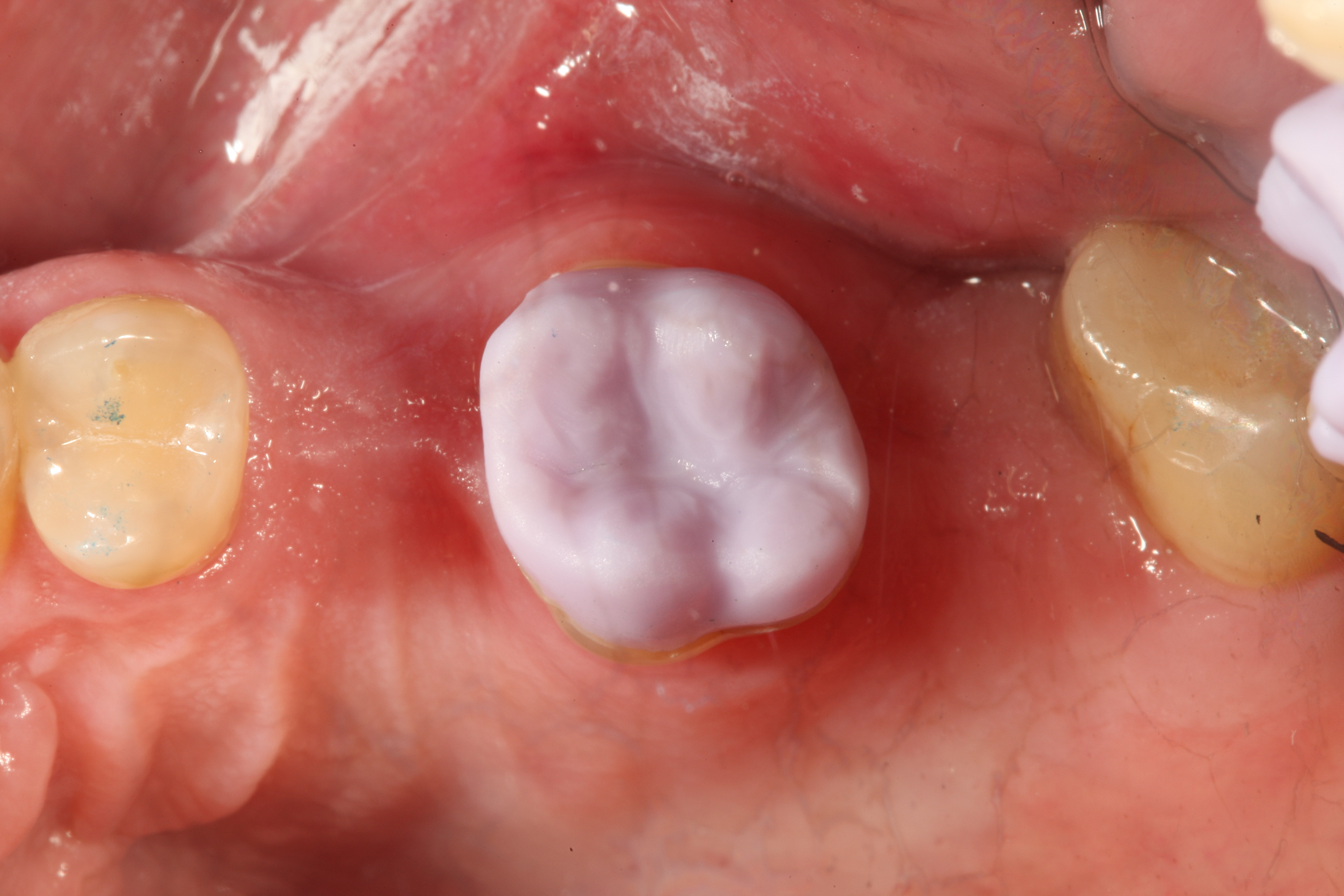
2009-03-31T15:37:49

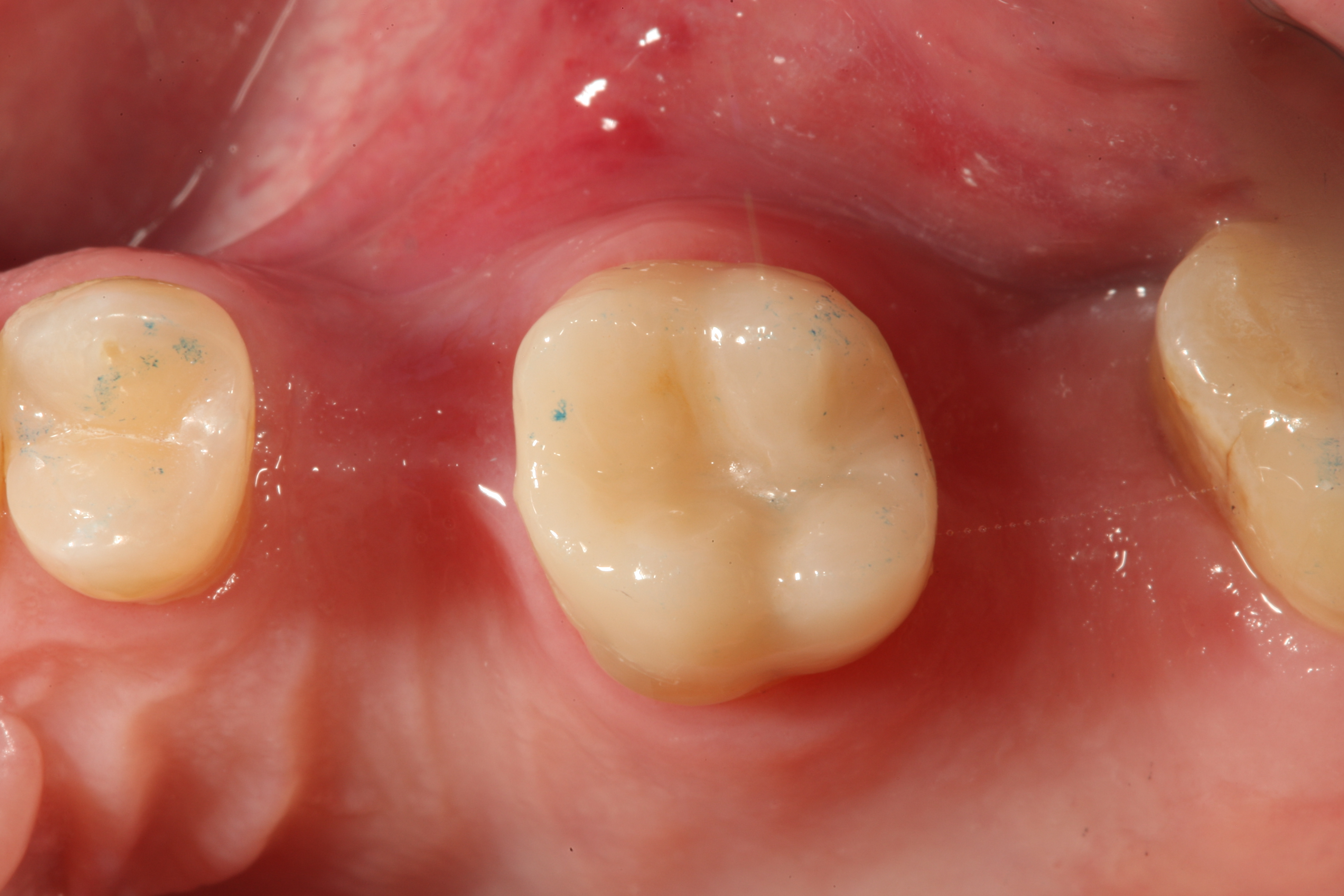
2009-03-31T16:42:44

== Usage ==
Crownlays are typically used in place of traditional post and core restorations. Post and core buildups are essentially rods of restorative material made out of titanium, stainless steel or resin that glean extra surface area against the internal walls of root canal-treated teeth when there is little to no teeth left above the gumline to hold a normal crown or onlay in place. The post and core buildup serve to aid in retention of a traditional crown but increase the likelihood of root fracture because chewing forces are directed vertically along the hollowed out and subsequent weaker remnants of the internal surfaces of an endodontically-treated (root-canal-treated) tooth. Crownlays are typically constructed from milled, monolithic blocks of solid porcelain which not only very intimately fit the prepared tooth, but are acid etched and bonded into place using very strong resin materials, decreasing the need for physical retention.
