= Pediatric crowns =

Dental crowns used for restoring damaged teeth of children

Pediatric crowns are dental crowns that provide full coverage for primary teeth. They can be made of different materials including stainless steel, polycarbonate, zirconium, or composite resin.

== Indications ==
Pediatric dentistry requires procedures with good long-term durability, due to the difficulty of working with young patients. Additionally, fear of dentistry and poor cooperation is common in pediatric dentistry. Therefore, simple procedures, like crowns, are an excellent choice and have excellent long-term prognosis. Pediatric crowns are often indicated for

- Extensive tooth decay and multi-surface cavities
- After pulp therapy procedures
- Developmental anomalies

== Types ==
Many different types of pediatric crowns are available that can be classified based on how they are retained

1. Those that are luted
2. Those that are bonded to the tooth

=== Luted crowns - Stainless Steel ===
Luted crowns use a cement that largely retains the tooth via mechanical retention. Stainless steel crowns (SSCs), also known as silver crowns were first described in the 1950s by Engel. They exist in different forms, either completely made of metal (preformed metal crowns) or with a layer of composite material covering the metal to improve esthetics (open-faced SSCs or pre-veneered SSCs).

==== Preformed metal crowns (PMCs) ====
Preformed metal crowns (PMCs) are available untrimmed, trimmed, or pre-contoured, with the latter having minimum chairside time for best fit and requiring the least modification. In addition to the general indication for crowns, PMCs are indicated for:

- In place of dental fillings as prevention of recurrent lesions for children with high caries risk
- In place of dental fillings for children who require general anesthetic for treatment
- Severe bruxism
- Use in primary molars but also in permanent molars as an interim measure in a growing child

PMCs are durable, corrosion resistant, and cost effective. They are also less technique sensitive compared to dental fillings and have a lower failure rate compared to large fillings. However, PMCs cannot be used in partially erupted teeth, are unesthetic due to their metallic appearance, and cannot be used in those with a nickel allergy.

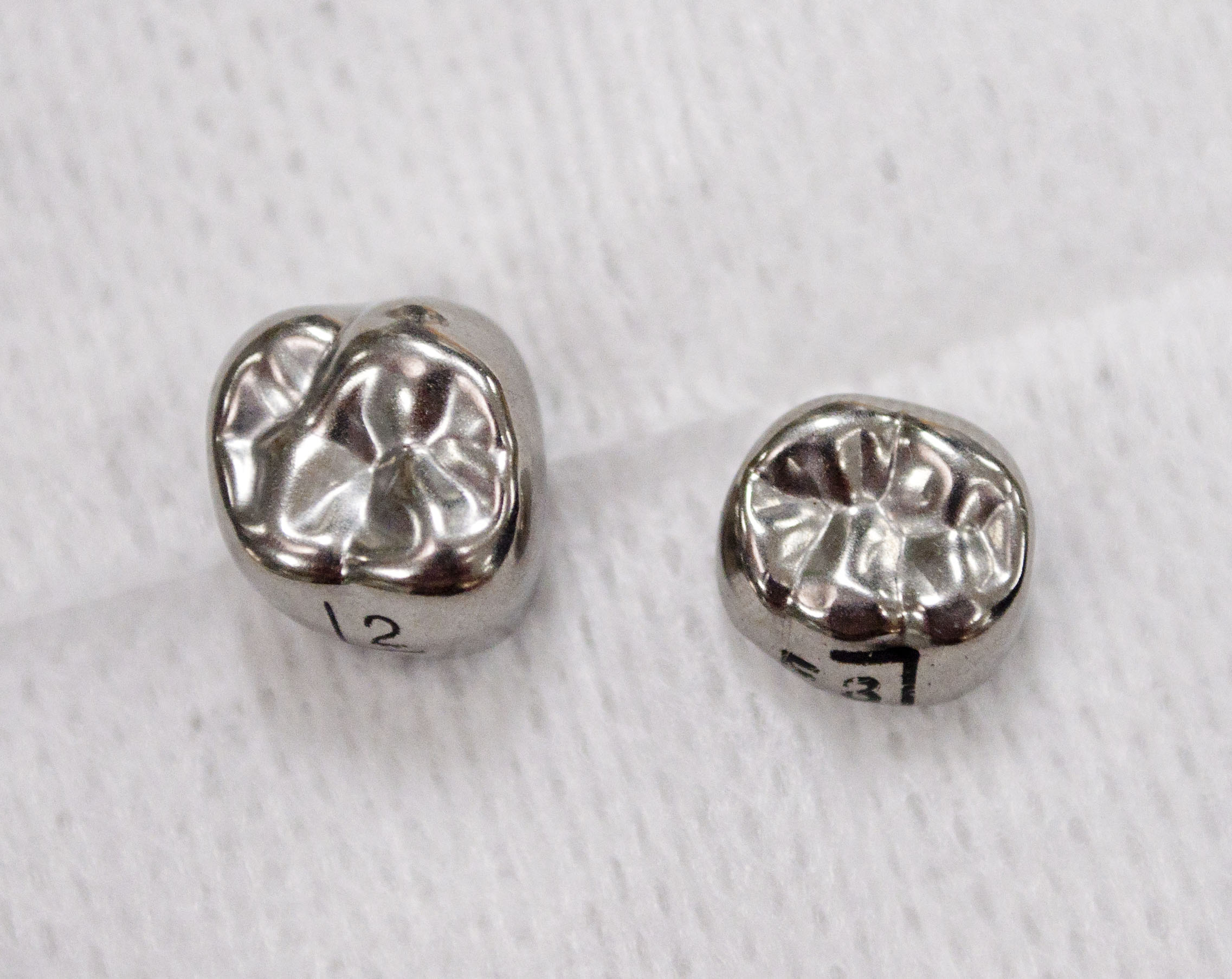
Preformed stainless steel crown of maxillary (left) and mandibular (right) tooth

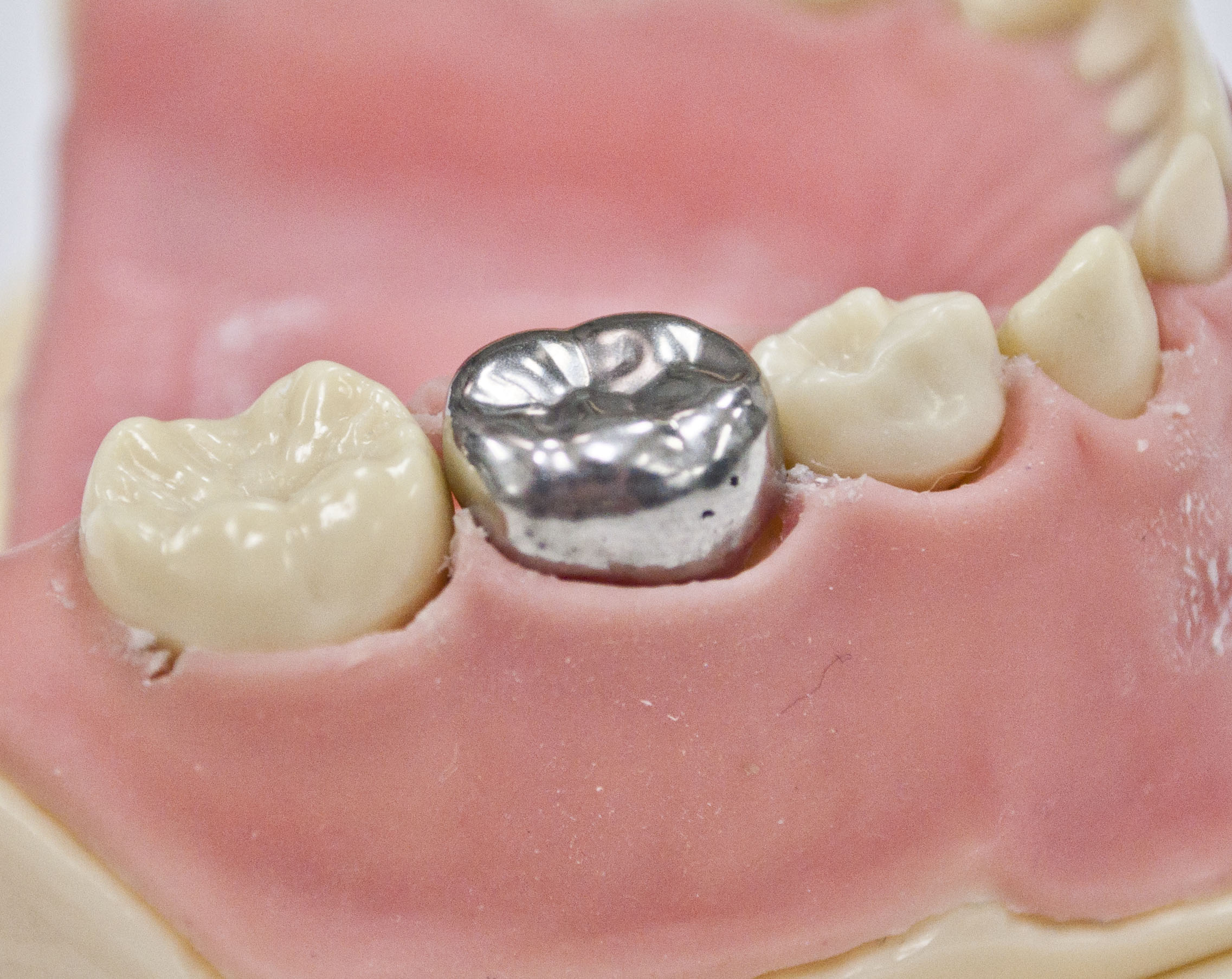
Preformed stainless steel crown placed over mandibular right second primary molar tooth

==== Open-faced and pre-veneered crowns ====
To address the unesthetic appearance of PMCs, a layer of composite resin or porcelain can be placed on the esthetic side of the tooth in open-faced and pre-veneered SSCs, respectively. While esthetics are improved, the improvement is compromised by limited shade selection, poor color stability, and visible metal margins. Additionally, preparing the tooth to accommodate these crowns may required more tooth removal. Furthermore, bonding and cementing these crowns is more technique sensitive. Finally, there is some concern over their longevity compared to PMCs.

=== Bonded crowns ===
Bonded crowns use a resin-based cement that adheres the crown to the tooth via chemical bonding. These crowns are made from various tooth-colored materials, which are more aesthetic, but require better clinical technique to execute.

==== Composite resin-based crowns ====
===== Composite resin crown =====
Composite resin crowns, also called strip crowns, are made by curing composite resin within a clear plastic mold over a prepared tooth. They are widely used for restoring the primary anterior teeth (e.g. due to early childhood caries) and discolored teeth. These crowns are aesthetic, affordable, and conservative, requiring minimal enamel removal. However, they are technique sensitive to place, and are more likely to fail if oral hygiene is inadequate.

===== New Millenium crowns =====
New Millenium Crowns are like strip crowns made from laboratory-enhanced composite resin material making them more expensive. Additionally, they are known to be very brittle.

==== Copolyester-based crowns ====
===== Polycarbonate crowns =====
Polycarbonate crowns are made from polyesters of carbonic acid and are molded to shape at high temperature and pressure. They have similar indications to strip crowns as polycarbonate crowns are also tooth colored. However, due to their brittleness and low abrasion resistance they are less frequently used than strip crowns.

===== Pedo jacket crowns =====
Pedo jacket crowns are made from tooth-colored copolyester outer crown form ("jacket") which is filled with a resin material. Unfortunately, pedo jacket crowns are only available in one shade and cannot be trimmed/reshaped with a bur as the material will melt.

==== Glass-based - Artglass crowns ====
Artglass crowns are made from polymer glass with fillers (e.g. micro-glass and silica) to improve their durability and aesthetics compared to strip crowns.

==== Ceramic-based - Zirconia crowns ====
Pediatric zirconia ceramic crowns are made of zirconium oxide stabilized with yttrium oxide. These are highly durable and are used for restoring both primary anterior and posterior teeth. They have been in use for children since 2010. Zirconia crowns are indicated for patients exhibiting bruxism, with a nickel-chromium allergy, or those requiring general anaesthesia for dental treatment. Compared to stainless steel crowns, zirconia crowns may cause less gingival inflammation initially after placement. While zirconia crowns show lower failure than other tooth-coloured crowns (e.g. strip crowns), they are more expensive.

There is insufficient clinical evidence to suggest the superiority of one type of paediatric crown to others. Many of these crowns have been used very successfully by dentists though there is inadequate good quality clinical evidence. The final decision of crown type considers factors of child cooperation, and parents' aesthetic preferences and financial situation.
