= Post and core =

Type of crown for dental restoration

A post and core crown is a type of dental restoration required where there is an inadequate amount of sound tooth tissue remaining to retain a conventional crown. A post is cemented into a prepared root canal, which retains a core restoration, which retains the final crown.

The role of the post is firstly to retain a core restoration and crown, and secondly to redistribute stresses down onto the root, thereby reducing the risk of coronal fracture. The post does not play any role in reinforcing or supporting the tooth and can in fact make it more likely to fracture at the root.

When deciding whether or not a tooth requires a post and core crown rather than a conventional crown, the following must be established:

1. Presence of an adequate ferrule (coronal tooth structure)
2. Sufficient length of canal to retain a post
3. Curvature and overall anatomy of root canal system
4. Sufficient root (radicular) dentine thickness for post preparation
5. Restorability of tooth

The benefit of placing a post into a root canal is improved retention of the crown. However, there are also disadvantages.

1. During the preparation for the post space there is a risk of perforation
2. The post can also make a tooth more likely to fracture
3. It makes future orthograde root canal treatment much more difficult
4. It is very destructive and requires excessive removal of tooth tissue. The presence of ferrule can increase the fracture resistance of the post.

Posts are more commonly required for anterior teeth rather than posterior teeth. The primary reason for this is that multi-rooted teeth have a large pulp chamber which can be utilised for retention of the core and therefore the crown, whereas anterior teeth are much smaller and less retentive.

When it is not possible to retain a core on a posterior tooth and a post is required, no more than one post should be used per tooth, and this should be placed in the largest canal available. This is because more than one preparation for a post will involve excessive dentine removal and increase the fracture risk. A better alternative to posts on a posterior tooth is core restoration which extends down into the entrance of the root canal through the Nayyar technique using an amalgam dowel–core. In this technique, retention for the amalgam-core is derived from the remaining pulp chamber and the prepared canals by extending amalgam to these areas.

Post and cores divide into two main groups: prefabricated and cast. Both of these systems employ a post that is placed within the root canal of the tooth being restored. Thus the tooth must first be endodontically treated. After the endodontic procedure has been completed, and the root canal(s) is/are filled with the inert gutta percha root canal filling material, some gutta percha is removed from the canal space. Gutta percha can be removed mechanically. thermally, and chemically (use of chemical solvents, however this method is not advocated nowadays due to difficulty in controlling the depth of softening) The space that exists coronal to the remaining gutta percha, called the post space, is now available within which to place a post. It is desirable to leave sufficient root filling material in the apical area to maintain an apical seal. This procedure does not even require local anesthesia as the tooth no longer has a nerve connection after the root canal treatment.

== Post length ==
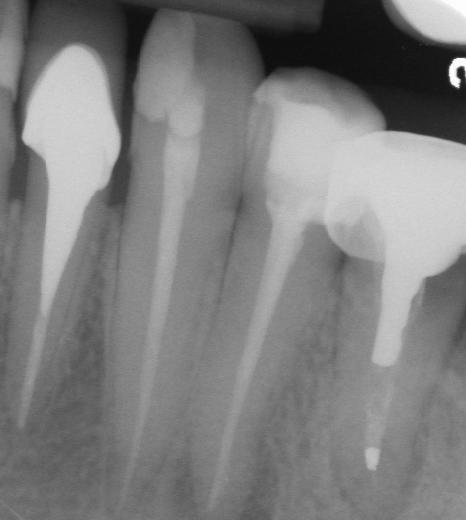
The post on the left is a tapered post, the one on the right is a parallel post

In post and core fabrication, it is desirable that the post descend at least two-thirds of the length of root canal (or not less than the height of the crown) in order to provide sufficient retention. Width of post should be taken into account for maximum strength and resistance to fracture, however, it should not be too broad as this would lead to lateral perforation and root fracture.

It is important to leave at least 4 mm-5 mm of gutta percha at the apex of the root canal, even at the expense of a longer post, because it is within the apical 4 mm of the root canal that the apical delta anastomose with the exterior surface of the root. Should these lateral canals not be blocked with the gutta percha and the cement used to place the gutta percha, the chances of microleakage and percolation of microbes are greatly increased, thereby increasing the likelihood of an endodontic failure.

It is not necessarily the length of the post within the root canal that provides for retention of the core, and thus the eventual crown, but rather the length of post that will exist within root structure that exists within surrounding bone. If the post is 16 mm long, but only extends 4 mm into root structure that is surrounded by solid bone, the restoration will have a poor prognosis. This consideration of crown-to-root ratio is essential when evaluating the tooth for a crown-lengthening procedure.

In the picture at right, the two teeth on the extreme left and right are the ones under discussion. The two teeth in the middle have been endodontically treated, but do not have post and cores.

== Types ==
=== Prefabricated post ===
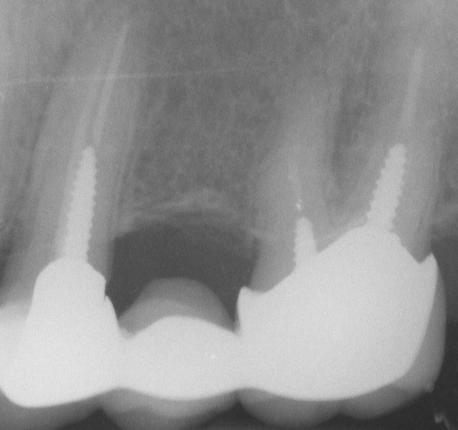
Maxillary posterior teeth restored with prefabricated screw posts

Prefabricated post and cores take less time to place, as they do not involve any lab work and can be inserted immediately upon the decision to utilize them, once the endodontic therapy has been completed and the post space cleared of gutta percha. After the prefabricated post is properly cemented into the post space, a core material, such as dental composite, can be packed around the cemented post. After the material has been cured or has had a chance to set and properly formed into a crown preparation, an impression can be taken for the fabrication of a prosthetic crown.

Metal prefabricated post systems are being superseded by fibre-reinforced composite resin post systems which offer improved resistance to untreatable fracture of tooth substrate such as vertical root fracture.

=== Cast post ===
In cases where the post space is not a good match for a prefabricated post, a cast post and core can be custom fabricated for the tooth. A resin pattern is produced by placing a preformed plastic "burnout" post into the post space and a resin material, such as Duralay resin, is used to build up the tooth to the proper dimensions. When this is completed, the pattern resin/plastic post is removed from the tooth structure and attached to a sprue former, much in the same way as is done with the wax pattern of a crown, and a single-unit cast post and core can thus be fabricated out of gold, titanium or another metal using the lost-wax technique. Alternatively, an impression can be taken of the post space and dental arch using a plastic post and a polyvinyl siloxane impression material, and this used to construct a suitable post in the dental laboratory.

== Materials used for posts ==
Posts can be made from non-metallic materials and metals.

=== Non-metallic ===
Overall, non-metallic posts show a lower incidence of root fracture due to their ability to resist high stress without permanent deformation and breaking. Non-metallic posts should not be used if there is insufficient sound tooth tissue (ferrule). The sound tooth tissue should be at least 1.5 mm circumferentially further apical to the core. Non-metallic posts are also more aesthetic than metal posts as metal posts will shine through all-ceraminc restorations and non-metallic posts' optical properties are closer to tooth tissue (except for carbon fibre posts due to the darker material). Non-metallic posts are easier to remove from teeth if needed than metal posts. Direct use of non-metallic posts in the most common use but they can also be built up in the laboratory.

==== Zirconia ====
Zirconia posts have high strength. However, they are brittle and have a high modulus which can potentially lead to root fracture. It can be difficult to remove the posts if needed. Zirconium posts can't be etched, thus leading to difficulty in retention of composite core.

==== Ceramic ====
Ceramic posts are made from a brittle material. These posts can be too strong which can lead to root fracture. It can be difficult and even impossible to remove a ceramic post.

==== Fibre reinforced resins ====
Fibre reinforced resins are a form of non-metallic posts and include carbon fibre, fibreglass and woven polyethylene ribbon-reinforced composites. These posts are more flexible, more aesthetic, and they have similar properties to dentine. However, they can only be used when there is sufficient tooth tissue remaining as they can delaminate upon exposure to moisture and this can lead to post failure.

===== Carbon fibre =====
Carbon fibre posts show very little deformation and are able to absorb and transfer forces similarly to dentine. However, these posts can be dark in colour which may lead to an unaesthetic result as the post can shine through the tooth.

===== Glass fibre/ fibreglass =====
Glass fibre posts are less brittle than ceramic posts. Posts that have unidirectional fibres are the strongest. However, it is difficult to produce this type of material as fibre bundles require infiltration and wetting with resin. This process can often leave voids on the surface of the fibres, leading to a weakened structure.

=== Metals ===
Traditionally metal posts have been used due to the good corrosion resistance and high yield strength.

==== Prefabricated metal posts ====
Stainless steel, titanium, titanium alloy and gold alloy are used to construct prefabricated posts. These types of posts are usually placed in the post space and the core is constructed with a direct restorative core material.

There are also prefabricated posts for which cores are cast onto. These posts are usually made of Type IV gold alloy (containing gold, platinum, palladium and iridium) or platinum, gold and iridium alloys, which are compatible with palladium and silver-free alloys or platinum, gold, palladium and silver alloy.

==== Cast metal posts ====
Often a metal alloy such as Type IV gold alloy is used.

== Post design ==
There are many types of post designed available for post and cores, utilizing various combinations of the following properties:

- parallel vs. tapered
- smooth-sided vs. serrated vs. threaded
- post only vs. with additional single-circle ring

In a classic case one of the best designs for a post to decrease the risk of failure is the narrowest and longest smooth, parallel post that one can fit into the post space. Utilizing the longest possible post ensures that the forces transmitted from the crown are distributed over as much of the root as possible. Using the appropriate diameter post ensures that as much natural tooth structure as possible is left to support the post and absorb the transmitted forces. A parallel post ensures the greatest retention of the post within the canal, and is perhaps utilized with only the slightest loss of tooth structure to the internal wall of the canal. A smooth-surfaced post transmits all the forces apically, which can cause fracture. Threaded or roughened posts, however, distribute the forces along the canal and are also more retentive than smooth posts. The ideal post is therefore parallel and threaded/roughened.

The use of a post and core does not strengthen the tooth prior to restoration with a crown; rather, it may contribute to the weakening of the tooth structure, as the forces placed upon the future prosthetic crown and core are now transmitted along virtually the entire length of the brittle, endodontically treated tooth. This inherent drawback is taken into account when the prognosis of the finished restoration is determined and explained to the patient prior to the onset of treatment. It is because of this increased risk of failure inherent in the use of post and core restorations that, when all of the independent failure rates of the many procedures needed for the restoration of the tooth are considered together (endodontic treatment, crown lengthening (when indicated), post and core and prosthetic crown), the patient is sometimes advised to have the tooth extracted and an implant placed.

The post with additional single-circle ring increases the contact surface area between the core and involved hard tissue of tooth significantly, therefore this system does not require a post with at least 2/3 of the root canal depth as its indication.

== Impressions ==
To ensure accurate recording of the preparation and finish line, gingival retraction is needed. Its use displaces the gingival tissues long enough to allow the impression material to flow down below the margin preparation lines and into the orifice. The use of the gingival retraction cord is a safe method as when used correctly will not harm the gingival tissues whilst ensuring the detail recorded is of good quality.

The various types of gingival retraction cords that can be used are twisted, braided and knitted. The use of all three requires pre-soaking in either water or an agent that encourages haemostasis. The haemostatic agent controls gingival haemorrhage following the preparation and prior to impression making.

Once the cord has been left in place for the required length of time, it is removed allowing the sulcus to be rinsed and dried in order to prevent the haemostatic agent from creating problems with the set of the impression material.

The two methods used for making impressions for post and cores are outlined below.

=== Direct technique ===
Sources:

- The material used with the post to create the pattern for both the post and core is a self-cure acrylic resin
- The wall of the canal is lubricated before the self-cure resin is placed within the intra-radicular portion of the canal around the post to ensure it has adhered and adapted to the post correctly
- Once set, the post is removed and examined for deficiencies. If any deficiencies are present that are not minor enough to be managed with wax, a remake of the impression will be required
- Once satisfied with the post, the core portion is built-up before it is refined to achieve the desired shape
- The occlusal clearance is assessed and the pattern is examined for a final time before sending to the laboratory for casting

=== Indirect technique ===
Sources:

- The post is bevelled to ensure a better fit within the canal as the preparation for the post will end in a point due to the instruments used for the preparation
- The post is then seated to the correct length and tested to confirm it resists displacement
- The occlusal end is trimmed until it is at the same level as the adjacent teeth and is made retentive with the use of a heated instrument. Lubricant is painted on the portion lying within the canal to aid its removal
- Gingival retraction as described above is completed
- A light bodied addition silicone material is syringed in the orifice and around the prep ensuring the prep is completely covered, before a heavier bodied addition silicone material in a stock tray is seated over the prep to make the impression of the full arch
- Once set the impression should be removed with the post embedded in-situ
- Finally, an impression is made of the opposing arch
