= Crown (dental restoration) =

Dental prosthetic that recreates the visible portion of a tooth

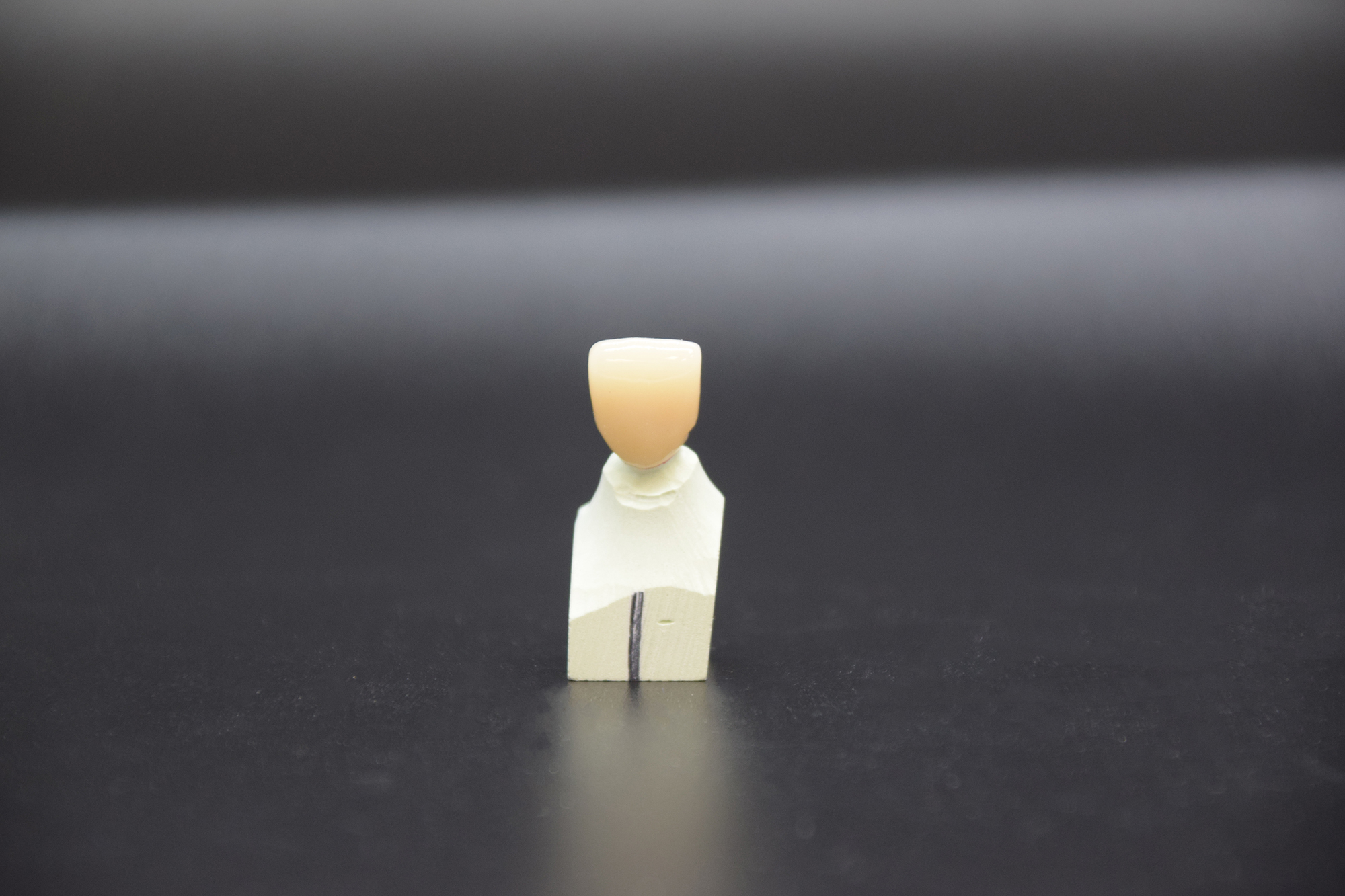
- An anterior dental crown on post
- ICD-10-PCS: Z98.811
- ICD-9-CM: 23.41
- MeSH: D003442

In dentistry, a crown or a dental cap is a type of dental restoration that completely caps or encircles a tooth or dental implant. A crown may be needed when a large dental cavity threatens the health of a tooth. Some dentists will also finish root canal treatment by covering the exposed tooth with a crown. A crown is typically bonded to the tooth by dental cement. They can be made from various materials, which are usually fabricated using indirect methods. Crowns are used to improve the strength or appearance of teeth and to halt deterioration. While beneficial to dental health, the procedure and materials can be costly.

The most common method of crowning a tooth involves taking a dental impression of a tooth prepared by a dentist, then fabricating the crown outside of the mouth. The crown can then be inserted at a subsequent dental appointment. This indirect method of tooth restoration allows use of strong restorative material requiring time-consuming fabrication under intense heat, such as casting metal or firing porcelain, that would not be possible inside the mouth. Because of its compatible thermal expansion, relatively similar cost, and cosmetic difference, some patients choose to have their crown fabricated with gold.

Computer technology is increasingly employed for crown fabrication in CAD/CAM dentistry.

== Indications for dental crowns ==
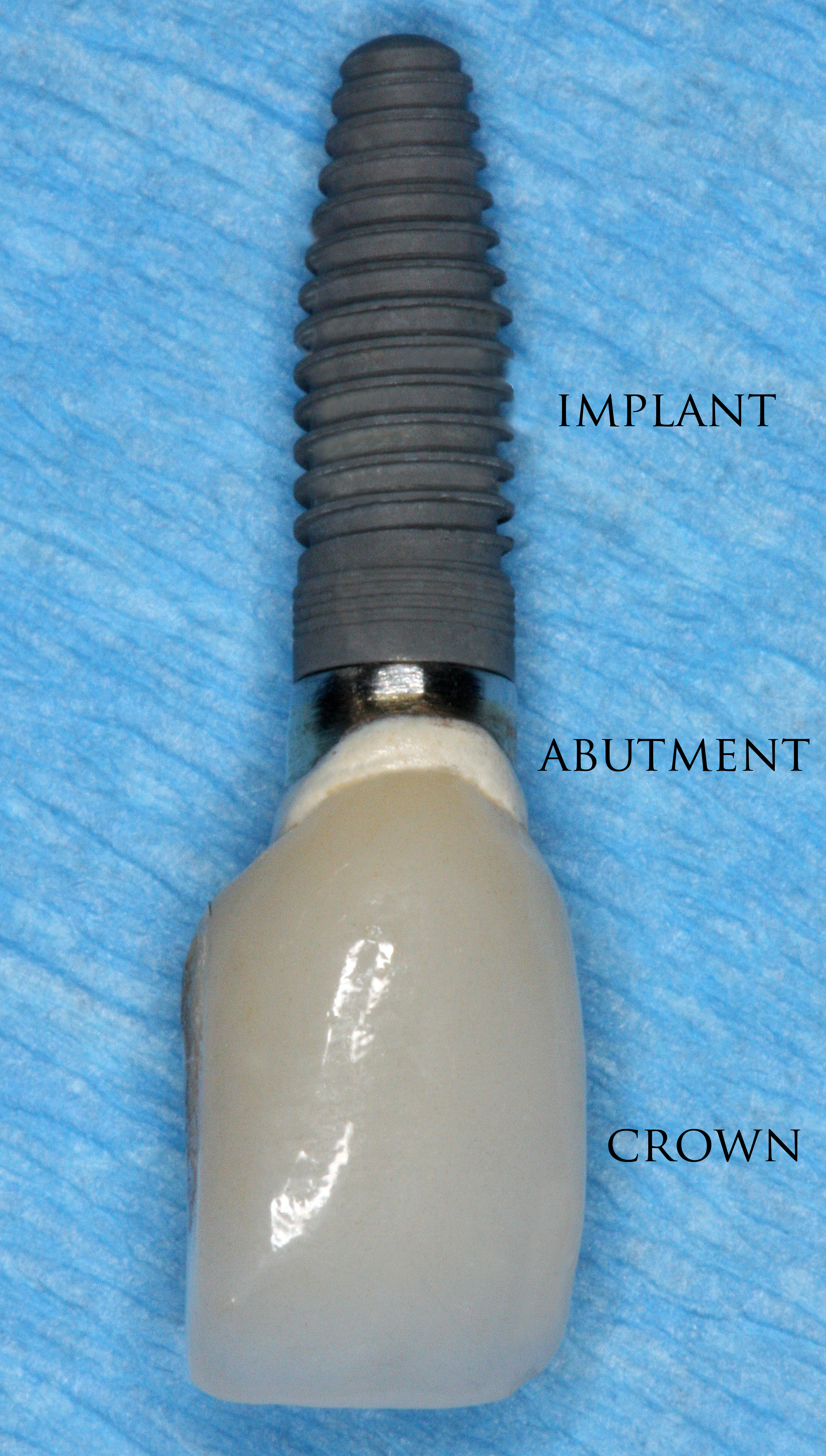
Crown used as part of implant restoration

Crowns are indicated to:

- Replace existing crowns which have failed.
- Restore the form, function and appearance of badly broken down, worn or fractured teeth, where other simpler forms of restorations are unsuitable or have been found to fail clinically.
- Improve the aesthetics of unsightly teeth which cannot be managed by simpler cosmetic and restorative procedures.
- Maintain the structural stability and reduce the risk of fractures of extensively restored teeth including those which have been endodontically treated.
- Restore the visible portion of a single dental implant.

=== Restoration of endodontically treated teeth ===
Traditionally, it has been proposed that teeth which have undergone root canal treatment are more likely to fracture and therefore require cuspal protection by providing occlusal coverage with an indirect restoration like crowns. This led to routine prescribing of crowns for root-treated teeth. However, recent review of literature reveals that there is no strong evidence to show that crowns are better than other routine restorations to restore root-filled teeth. The general advice is that dentists should use their clinical experience in view of the patient's preferences when making the decision of using a crown. As a rule of thumb, the use of crowns and other indirect restorations for root treated teeth is justified when the surface area of the access cavity exceeds one third of the occlusal surface of the tooth, when the lingual or buccal walls are undermined or when the mesial and distal marginal ridges are missing.

== Clinical stages of dental crown provision ==
1. Assessment
2. Choice of restoration
3. Tooth preparation
4. Construction and fit of temporary restoration
5. Tooth preparation impressions
6. Fit of definitive restoration
7. Short-term follow up
8. Long-term follow up

== Assessment ==
In order to ensure optimum condition and longevity for the proposed crowns, several factors need to be explored by conducting a thorough and targeted patient history and clinical dental examination. These factors include:

- Patient factors
  - Patient expectations
  - Patient motivation to adhere to the treatment plan and maintain results
  - Financial and time costs to the patient
- Biological factors
  - Periodontal health status and periodontal disease risk
  - Pulpal health and endodontic disease risk
  - Caries and caries risk
  - Occlusion and occlusal problems risk
- Mechanical factors
  - Amount of remaining tooth structure
  - Height and width of tooth to be prepared
  - Attachment levels of the tooth to be prepared
  - Root shape and length of the tooth to be prepared
- Aesthetic factors

== Choice of restoration ==
The choice(s) of crown restoration can be described by:

- The dimensions and percentage coverage of the natural crown
  - Full crowns
  - 3/4 and 7/8 crowns
- Material to be used
  - Metal
  - Metal-ceramic crowns
  - Full ceramic crowns

=== 3/4 and 7/8 crowns ===
These restorations are a hybrid between an onlay and a full crown. They are named based on the estimated wall coverage of the walls of the tooth; e.g. the 3/4 crown aims to cover three out of the four walls, with the buccal wall being usually spared, thus reducing sound tooth tissue to be prepared. They are normally fabricated in gold. Grooves or boxes are normally added to the preparations as close to the unprepared wall as possible to increase retention of the crown. Despite its advantages of reducing sound tooth preparation, these crowns are not commonly prescribed in practice because they are technically difficult and have poor patient acceptability due to the metal showing through in their smile.

=== Full metal crowns ===
As the name suggests, these crowns are entirely cast in a metal alloy. There are a multitude of alloys available and the selection of a particular alloy over another depends on several factors including cost, handling, physical properties, biocompatibility. The American Dental Association categorizes alloys in three groups: high-noble, noble and base metal alloys.

==== High-noble and noble alloys ====
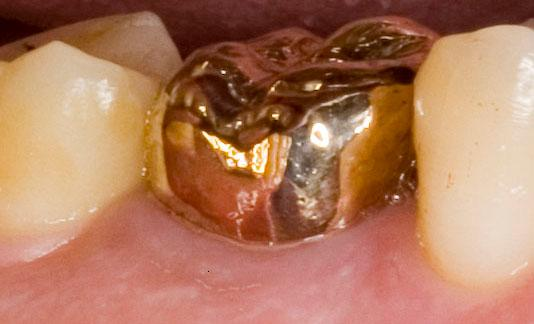
Gold shell crown

Noble and high-noble alloys used in casting crowns are generally based on alloys of gold. Gold is not used in its pure form as it is too soft and has poor mechanical strength. Other metals included in gold alloys are copper, platinum, palladium, zinc, indium and nickel. All types of gold casting alloys used in prosthodontics (Type I - IV) are categorised by their percentage content of gold and hardness, with Type I being the softest and Type IV the hardest. Generally, Type III and IV alloys (62 - 78% and 60 - 70% gold content respectively) are used in casting of full crowns, as these are hard enough to withstand occlusal forces. Gold crowns (also known as gold shell crowns) are generally indicated for posterior teeth due to aesthetic reasons. They are durable in function and strong in thin sections, therefore require minimal tooth preparation. They also have similar wear properties to enamel, so they are not likely to cause excessive wear to the opposing tooth. They have good dimensional accuracy when cast which minimises chair-side/appointment time and can be relatively easy to polish if any changes are required. Palladium based alloys are also used. These were introduced as a cheaper alternative to gold alloys in the 1970s. Palladium has a strong whitening effect giving most of its alloys a silverish appearance.

==== Base-metal alloys ====
Cast base-metal alloys are rarely used to make full metal crowns. They are more commonly used as part of metal-ceramic crowns as bonding alloys. When compared to high-noble and noble alloys, they are stronger and harder; they can be used in thinner sections (0.3mm as opposed to 0.5mm) however they are harder to adjust and are more likely to cause excessive wear on real opposing teeth. Furthermore, there may be problems with people who have a nickel allergy.

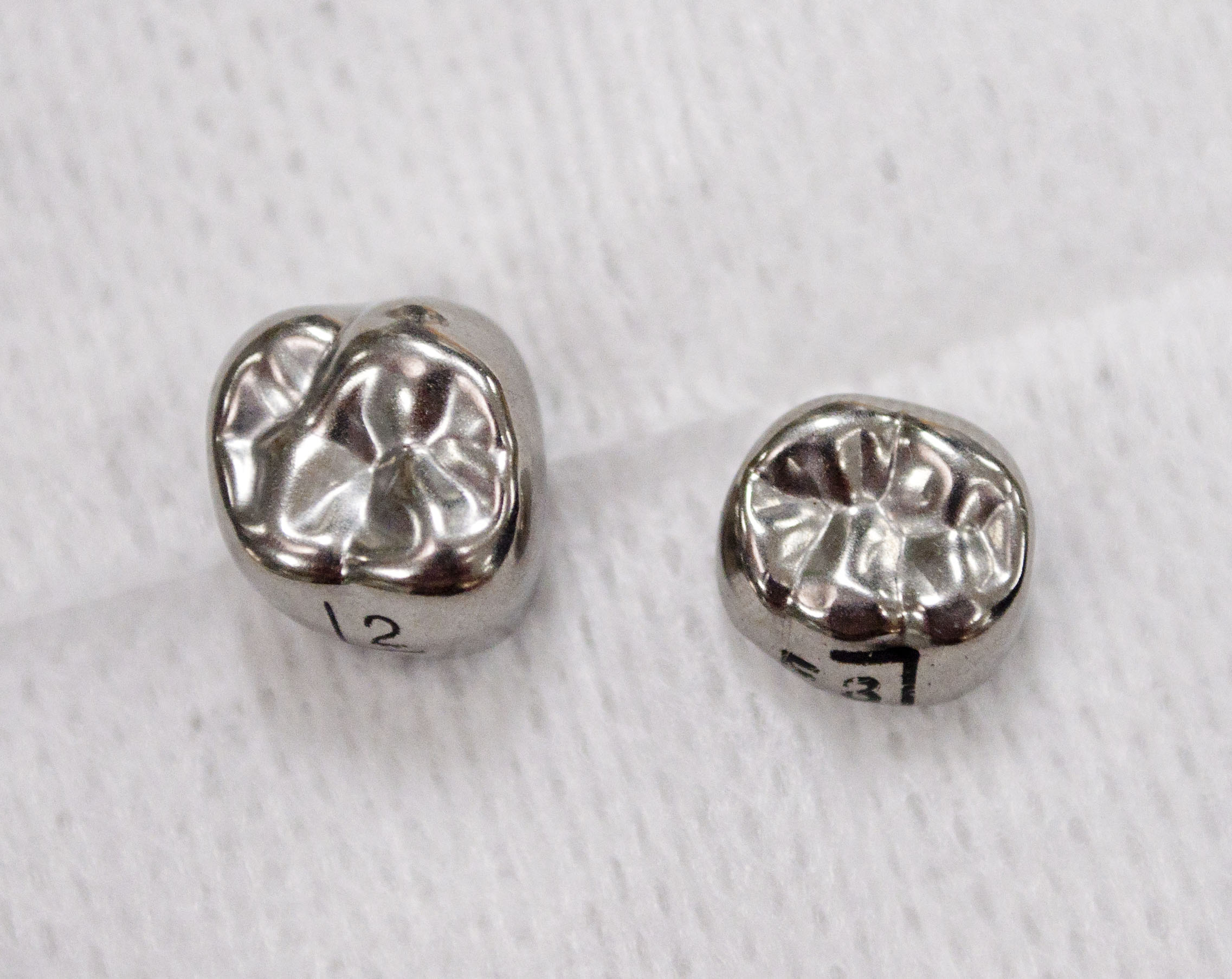
Stainless steel preformed crowns

Common base-metal alloys used in dentistry are:

- Silver-palladium
- Silver-palladium-copper
- Nickel-chromium
- Nickel-chromium-beryllium
- Cobalt-chromium
- Titanium

==== Titanium ====
Titanium and titanium alloys are highly biocompatible. Its strength, rigidity and ductility are similar to that of other casting alloys used in dentistry. Titanium also readily forms an oxide layer on its surface which gives it anti-corrosive properties and allows it to bond to ceramics, a useful property in the manufacture of metal-ceramic crowns.

=== Full ceramic crowns ===
Dental ceramics or porcelains are used for crowns manufactured primarily for their aesthetic properties compared to all metal restorations. These materials are generally quite brittle and prone to fracture. Many classifications have been used to categorise dental ceramics, with the simplest, based on the material from which they are made, i.e. silica, alumina or zirconia.

==== Silica ====
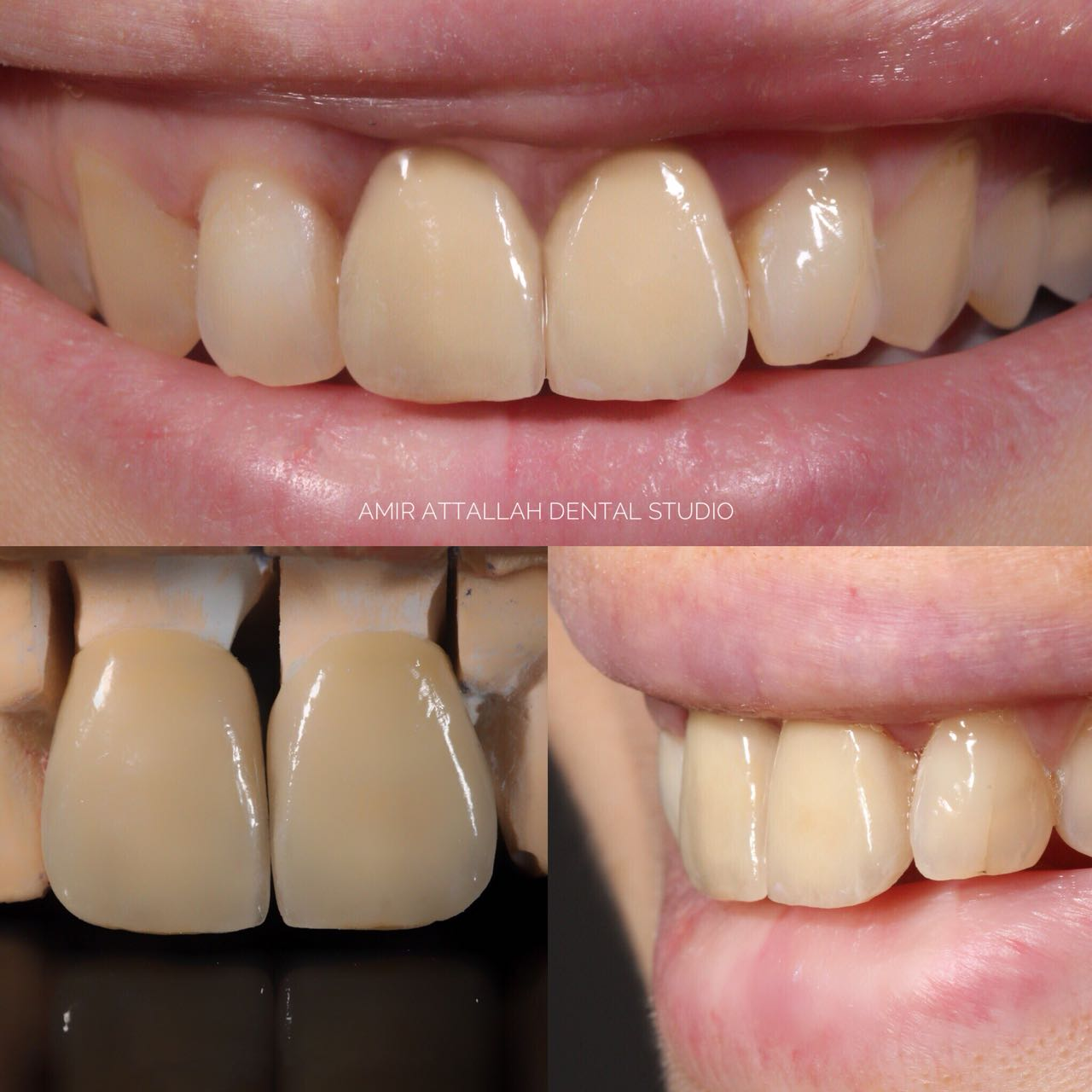
Feldspathic porcelain crowns fabricated on a dental model, then cemented on the upper central anterior teeth using luster paste of glass ionomer

Silica-based ceramics are highly aesthetic due to their high glass content and excellent optical properties due to the addition of filler particles which enhance opalescence, fluorescence which can mimic the colour of natural enamel and dentine. These ceramics, however, suffer from poor mechanical strength, and therefore often used for veneering stronger substructures.

Examples include aluminosilicate glass, e.g. feldspathic, synthetic porcelain, and leucite reinforced ceramics.

Mechanical properties can be improved by the addition of filler particles, e.g. lithium disilicate, and are therefore termed glass ceramics. Glass-ceramics can be used alone to make all-ceramic restorations either as a single form (termed uni-layered) or can act as a substructures for subsequent veneering (or layering) with weaker feldspathic porcelain (restorations termed bi-layered).

==== Alumina ====
Alumina (aluminium oxide) was introduced as a dental substructure (core) in 1989 when the material was slip cast, sintered, and infiltrated with glass. More recently, glass-infiltrated alumina cores are produced by electrophoretic deposition, a rapid nanofabrication process. During this process, particles of a slip are brought to the surface of a dental die by an electric current, thereby forming a precision-fitting core greenbody in seconds. Margins are then trimmed and the greenbody is sintered and infiltrated with glass. Glass-infiltrated alumina has significantly higher porcelain bond strength over CAD/CAM produced zirconia and alumina cores without glass.

Alumina cores without glass are produced by milling pre-sintered blocks of the material utilizing a CAD/CAM dentistry technique. Cores without glass must be oversized to compensate for shrinkage that occurs when the core is fully sintered. Milled cores are then sintered and shrink to the correct size.

All alumina cores are layered with tooth tissue-like feldspathic porcelain to make true-to-life color and shape. Dental artists called ceramists, can customize the "look" of these crowns to individual patient and dentist requirements. Alumina cores have better translucency than zirconia, but worse than lithium disilicate.

==== Zirconia ====
Yttria-stabilized zirconia, also known simply as zirconia, is a very hard ceramic that is used as a strong base material in some full ceramic restorations. Zirconia is relatively new in dentistry and the published clinical data is correspondingly limited. The zirconia used in dentistry is zirconium oxide (ZrO_{2}) which has been stabilized with the addition of yttrium oxide. Yttria-stabilized zirconia is also known as YSZ.

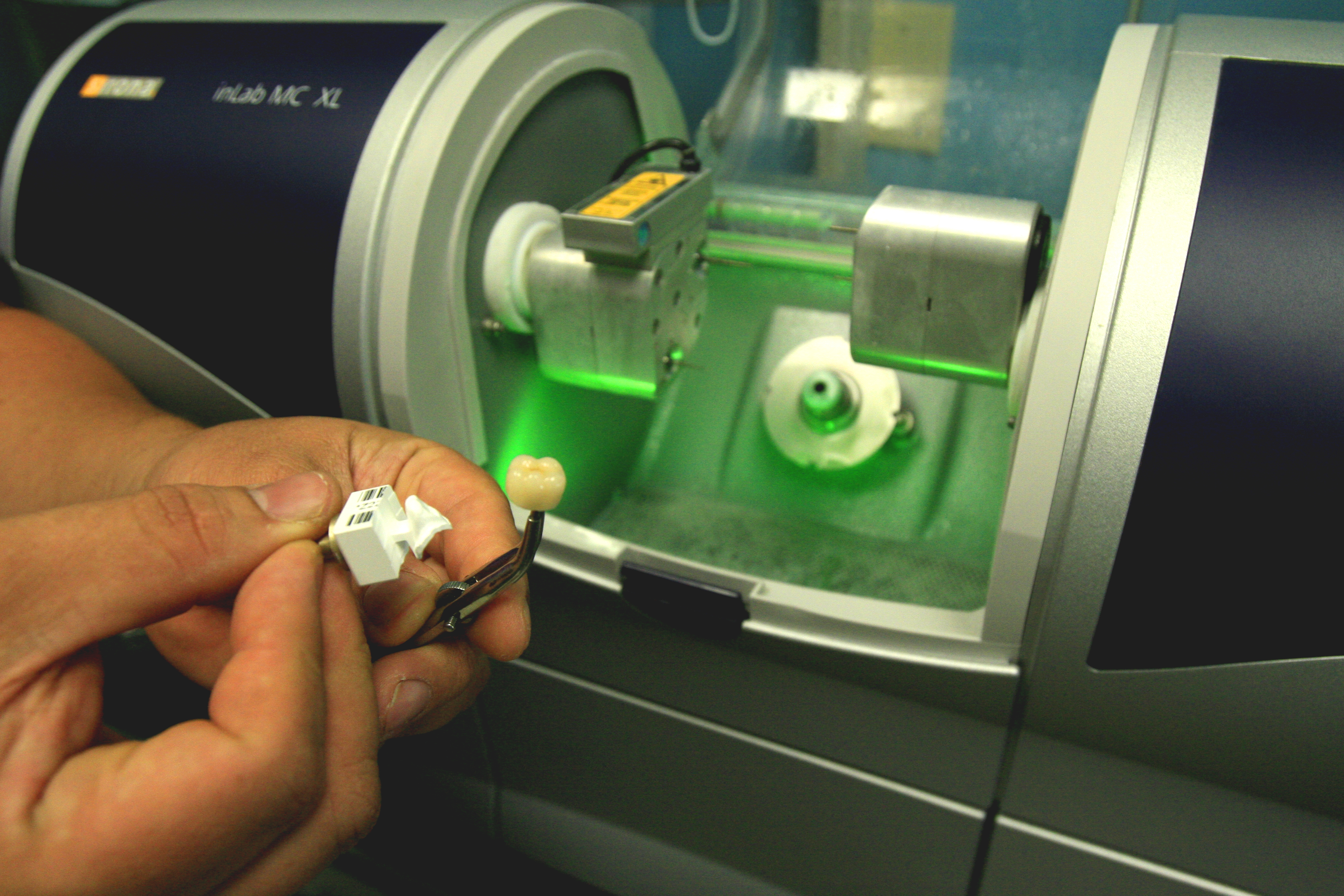
Veneered zirconia crowns

The zirconia substructure (core) is usually designed on a digital representation of the patient's mouth, which is captured with a three-dimensional digital scan of the patient, impression, or model. The core is then milled from a block of zirconia in a soft pre-sintered state. Once milled, the zirconia is sintered in a furnace where it shrinks by 20% and reaches its full strength of 850–1000 MPa. Recently, the strength of zirconia for dental restorations reaching 1200 MPa is reported. The zirconia core structure can be layered with tooth tissue-like feldspathic porcelain to create the final color and shape of the tooth. Because bond strength of layered porcelain fused to zirconia is not strong; chipping of the conventional veneering ceramic frequently occurs, crowns and bridges are nowadays increasingly made with monolithic zirconia crowns produced from a color and structure graded zirconia block, and coated with a thin layer of glaze stains. Esthetic prosthetic restorations, with natural reflection, color from within and color gradients influenced by the internal dentinal core anatomy can best be accomplished by veneered zirconia, rather than with crowns of monolithic zirconia. In the production of dental restorations specifically made for one patient, dental technicians with their problem-solving skills, dexterity and cognitive skills are until recently the only way to provide the required esthetics, individuality and artistry with porcelain. Fear for chipping of conventional mono glass component zirconia porcelains on the longer term and price pressure on manual application of porcelain, are possible drivers for the monolithic zirconia restorations. However, by the application of multi-glass component porcelain chipping is no longer an issue, especially with prosthetic mimetic restorations where the crown follows a model of the natural tooth in two layers: a histo-anatomic dentin layer mimicking the dentin shape of the dentition of the patient and an enamel layer. These restorations that mimic the structure of natural teeth by cognitive design of the dentin core present a new production paradigm to fabricate natural restorations of veneered zirconia using a high strength porcelain with CAD/CAM. These crowns are produced with a core of tooth-colored tetragonal zirconia, on which a high strength translucent porcelain layer has been applied and subsequently milled to size. In the subtle cooperation between the dentin-colored zirconia and the veneering porcelain, the zirconia shines through the translucent porcelain layer, all the more as the porcelain layer is thinner. This creates the natural color dynamics with color "from the inside" as found in natural elements, instead of color "on the outside", with monolithic zirconia. As a result, the natural tooth, in terms of esthetics and hardness, is approached closer than crowns made from solid monolithic zirconia. This implies that the histo-anatomic dentin core is the key to esthetic crowns.

Zirconia is the hardest known ceramic in industry and the strongest material used in dentistry, it has to be fabricated using a CAD/CAM process but not the conventional manual dental technology. Because of this monolithic zirconia does not wear itself as the normal vertical wear of 25-75 microns of natural enamel and porcelain, there are no clinical data on the fact whether as a consequence too high zirconia crowns will damage opposing dentition on the longer term. Although in two body wear testing of monolithic, veneered and glazed zirconia and their corresponding enamel antagonists showed similar wear, at least twice as much extensive, and branched enamel microcracks were observed in the samples opposing monolithic zirconia.

==== Monolithic zirconia ====
Monolithic zirconia crowns tend to be opaque in appearance with a high value and they lack translucency and fluorescence. For the sake of appearance, many dentists will not use monolithic crowns on anterior (front) teeth. Monolithic zirconia crowns are produced from a color- and structure-graded zirconia block and coated with a thin layer of glaze stains which also provides some kind of fluorescence. The "graded" zirconia crown has a darker cervical area consisting of tetragonal zirconia, a main tooth color in the buccal area, and a translucent incisal edge consisting of cubic zirconia. The only thing a dental technician has to do is to use the proper height of the zirconia block so that the crown fits in all the different color zones. Although on the outside the color gradient mimics natural teeth, they are still far from the optical, physical, and esthetic properties of natural teeth.

To a large extent, materials selection in dentistry determine the strength and appearance of a crown. Some monolithic zirconia materials produce the strongest crowns in dentistry (the registered strength for some zirconia crown materials is near 1200 MPa), but these crowns are not usually considered to be natural enough for use in the front of the mouth. Although not as strong, some of the newer zirconia materials are better in appearance but generally still not as good as porcelain-fused crowns. By contrast, when porcelain is fused to glass-infiltrated alumina, crowns are very natural-looking and very strong, though not as strong as monolithic zirconia crowns.

Zirconia crowns are said to be less abrasive to opposing teeth than metal-ceramic crowns.

Other crown material properties to be considered are thermal conductivity and radiolucency. Stability/looseness of fit on the prepared tooth and cement gap at the margin are sometimes related to materials selection, though these crown properties are also commonly related to system and fabricating procedures.

==== Lithium-disilicate ====
Another monolithic material, lithium disilicate, produces extremely translucent leucite-reinforced crowns that often appear to be too gray in the mouth. To overcome this, the light shade polyvalent colorants take on a distinctly unnatural, bright white appearance.

However, research has shown that the shade of the supporting tooth or abutment significantly influences the final appearance of lithium disilicate crowns. Discolored foundations can adversely affect the esthetics of the restoration. Utilizing opaque ceramic cores or liners has been suggested to mitigate this issue, improving the color match and overall appearance.

=== Metal-ceramic crowns (P-F-M Crown) ===
These are a hybrid of metal and ceramic crowns. The metal part is normally made of a base metal alloy (termed bonding alloy). The properties of the metal alloy chosen should match and complement that of the ceramic to be bonded otherwise problems like delamination or fracturing of the ceramic can occur. To obtain an aesthetic finish which is able to be functional with normal mastication activity, a minimal thickness of ceramic and metallic material is required, which should be planned for during tooth preparation stage.

Ceramic bonds to the metal framework by three methods:

- Compression fit (via ceramic shrinkage on firing)
- Micro-mechanical retention (via surface irregularities)
- Chemical union (via oxide formation)

== Tissue control and gingival retraction ==
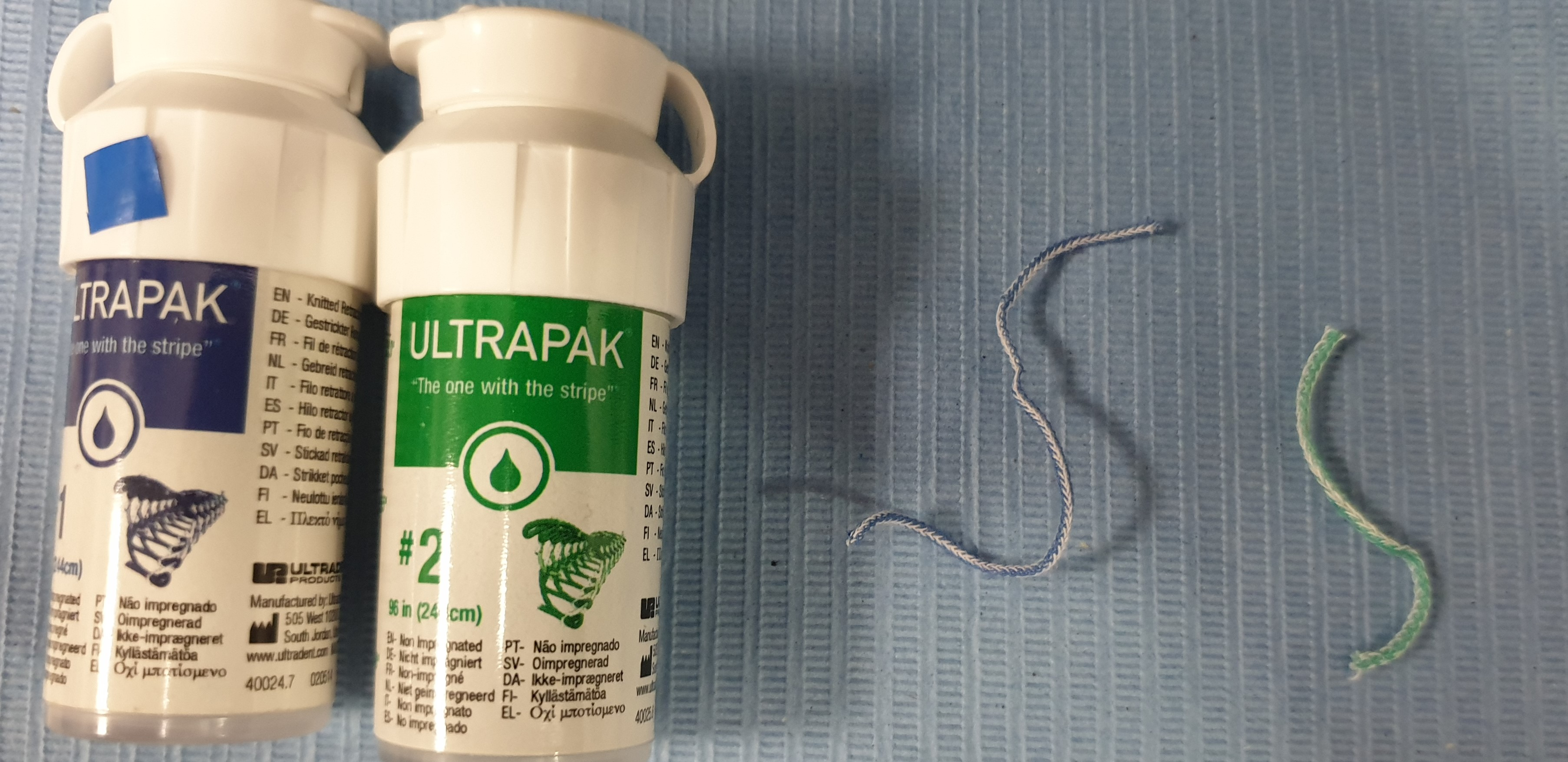
Gingival retraction cord

Gingival retraction refers to the displacement of the free gingivae. For crowns with margins which are supragingival, there is no need for gingival retraction provided there is good moisture control.

For crown preparations which have subgingival margins, tissue control is necessary at the preparation stage and impression stage to ensure visibility, good moisture control and ensure enough impression material can be placed to accurately record the marginal areas.

Another method to expose the margins of a subgingival preparation is to use electrosurgery or crown lengthening surgery.

== Tooth preparation ==
The design of a preparation for a tooth to accept a crown follows five basic principles:

1. Retention and resistance
2. Preservation of tooth structure
3. Structural durability
4. Marginal integrity
5. Preservation of the periodontium

Aesthetics can also play a role in planning the design.

=== Retention and resistance ===
As there are currently no biologically compatible cements which are able to hold the crown in place solely through their adhesive properties, the geometric form of the preparation is vital in providing retention and resistance to hold the crown in place. Within the context of prosthodontics, retention refers to resistance of movement of a restoration along the path of insertion or along the long axis of the tooth. Resistance refers to the resistance of movement of the crown by forces applied apically or in an oblique direction which prevents movement under occlusal forces. Retention is determined by the relationship between opposing surfaces of the preparation (e.g. the relationship of the buccal and lingual walls).

==== Taper ====
Theoretically, the more parallel the opposing walls of a preparation, the more retention is achieved. However this is almost impossible to achieve clinically. It is standard for preparations for full coverage crowns to slightly taper or converge in an occlusal direction. This allows the preparation to be visually inspected, prevent undercuts, compensate for crown fabrication inaccuracies and allow, at the cementation stage, for excess cement to escape with the ultimate aim of optimising the seating of the crown on the preparation. Generally axial walls prepared using a long tapered high speed burs confer a 2 - 3° taper on each wall and an overall 4 - 6° taper to the preparation. As taper increases, retention decreases so taper should be kept to a minimum whilst ensuring elimination of undercuts. An overall taper of 16° is said to be clinically achievable and being able to fulfill the aforesaid requirements. Ideally, the taper should not exceed 20 degrees as will negatively impact retention.

==== Length ====
Occluso-gingival length or height of the crown preparation affects both resistance and retention. Generally, the taller the preparation, the greater the surface area is. For the crown to be retentive enough, the length of the preparation must be greater than the height formed by the arc of the cast pivoting around a point on the margin on the opposite side of the restoration. The arc is affected by the diameter of the tooth prepared, therefore the smaller the diameter, the shorter the length of the crown needs to be to resist removal. Retention of short-walled teeth with a wide diameter can be improved by placing grooves in the axial walls, which has the effect of reducing the size of the arc.

==== Freedom of displacement ====
Retention can be improved by geometrically limiting the number of paths along which the crown can be removed from the tooth presentation, with maximum retention being reached when only one path of displacement is present. Resistance can be improved by inserting components like grooves.

=== Preservation of tooth structure ===
Fractures of endodontically treated teeth increase considerably in the posterior dentition when cuspal protection is not provided by a crown (after 1 to 25 years).

Preparing a tooth to accept a full coverage crown is relatively destructive. The procedure can damage the pulp irreversibly, through mechanical, thermal and chemical trauma and making the pulp more susceptible to bacterial invasion. Therefore, preparations must be as conservative as possible, whilst producing a strong retentive restoration. Although it may be seen as contradictory to the previous statement, at times, sound tooth structure may need to be sacrificed in order to prevent further more substantial and uncontrolled loss of tooth structure.

=== Structural durability ===
In order to last, the crown must be made of enough material to withstand normal masticatory function and should be contained within the space created by the tooth preparation, otherwise problems may arise with aesthetics and occlusal stability (i.e. high restorations) and cause periodontal inflammation. Depending on the material used to create the crown, minimal occlusal and axial reductions are required to house the crown.

==== Occlusal reduction ====
For gold alloys there should be 1.5mm clearance, whilst metal-ceramic crowns and full ceramic crowns require 2.0 mm. The occlusal clearance should follow the natural outline of the tooth; otherwise there may be areas of the restorations where the material may be too thin.

==== Functional cusp bevel ====
For posterior teeth, a wide bevel is required on the functional cusps, palatal cusps for maxillary teeth and buccal cusps for mandibular teeth. If this functional cusp bevel is not present and the crown is cast to replicate the correct size of the tooth, bulk of material may be too little at this point to withstand occlusal surfaces.

==== Axial reduction ====
This should allow enough thickness for the material chosen. Depending on the type of crown to be fitted, there is a minimum preparation thickness. Generally, full metal crowns require at least 0.5mm, whist metal-ceramic and full ceramic crowns require at least 1.2mm

=== Marginal integrity ===
In order for the cast restoration to last in the oral environment and to protect the underlying tooth structure, the margins between cast and tooth preparation need to be as closely adapted. The marginal line design and position should facilitate plaque control, allow for adequate thickness of the restorative material chosen therefore providing enough strength for the crown at the margin. Several types of finish line configurations have been advocated, each having some advantages and disadvantages (see the table below). Chamfer finish are normally advocated for full metal margins and shoulders are generally required to provide enough bulk for metal-ceramic crowns and full ceramic crown margins. Some evidence suggests adding a bevel to margins, especially where these are heavy, to decrease the distance between the crown and the tooth tissue.

Advantages and disadvantages of different marginal finish lines.
Name	Advantages	Disadvantages	Indications
Knife edge	Minimal tooth destruction	Poor aesthetics with ceramic crowns Weaker crown margins	Not recommended
Chamfer	Minimal tooth destruction Minimal stress	Inadequate crown strength and aesthetics if ceramic used; need to be careful not to leave lip of unsupported enamel (see also Deep chamfer)	Metal crowns margins; lingual margins of metal-ceramic crowns
Deep chamfer	Moderate tooth destruction Minimal stress	Potential lip formation	Same as Chamfer
Radial shoulder	Best aesthetics Best crown strength Less stress than classical shoulder	Destructive More stress than a chamfer	
Radial shoulder with a bevel	Excellent crown strength Less stress than a classic shoulder; Allows for removal of unsupported enamel	Destructive More stress than a chamfer	
Classic shoulder	Best aesthetics Maximal crown strength Prevents over-contouring	Most destruction and tooth stress	Facial margin of metal-ceramic crowns or all-ceramic crowns

=== Preservation of the periodontium ===
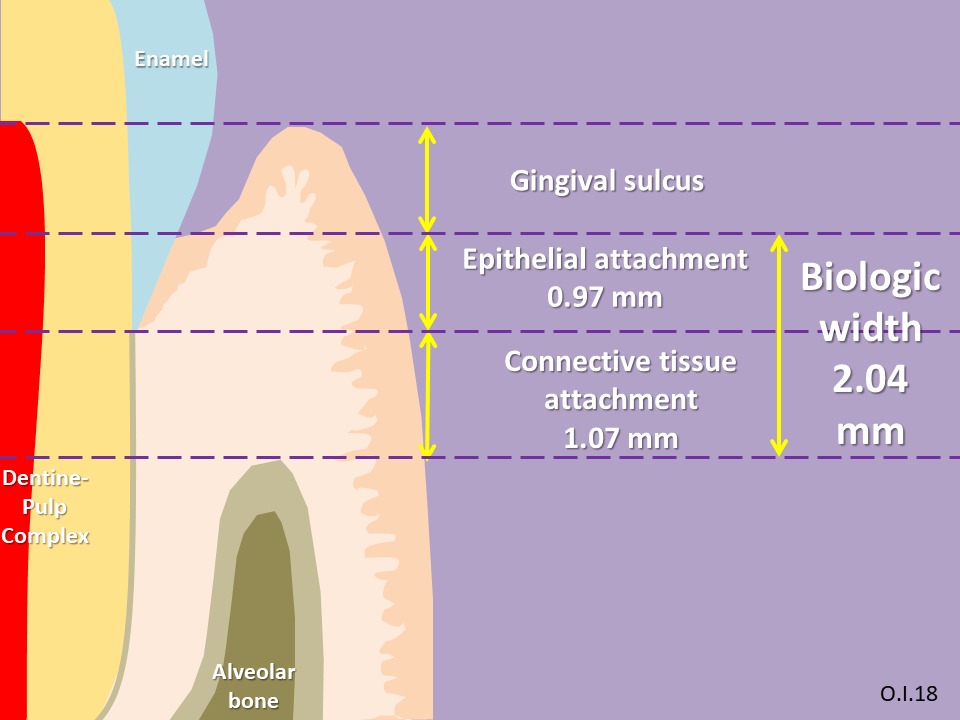
Biologic width

Linked to marginal integrity, placement of the finish line can directly affect the ease of manufacturing the crown and health of the periodontium. Best results are achieved where the finish line is above the gum line as this is fully cleanable. They should also be placed on enamel as this creates a better seal. Where circumstances require the margins to be below the gum line, caution is required as several problems can arise. First, there might be issues in terms of capturing the margin when making impressions during the manufacturing process leading to inaccuracies. Secondly, the biologic width, the mandatory distance (roughly 2 mm) to be left between the height of the alveolar bone and the margin of the restoration; if this distance is violated, it can result in gingival inflammation with pocket formation, gingival recession and loss of alveolar bone crest height. In these cases, crown lengthening surgery should be considered.

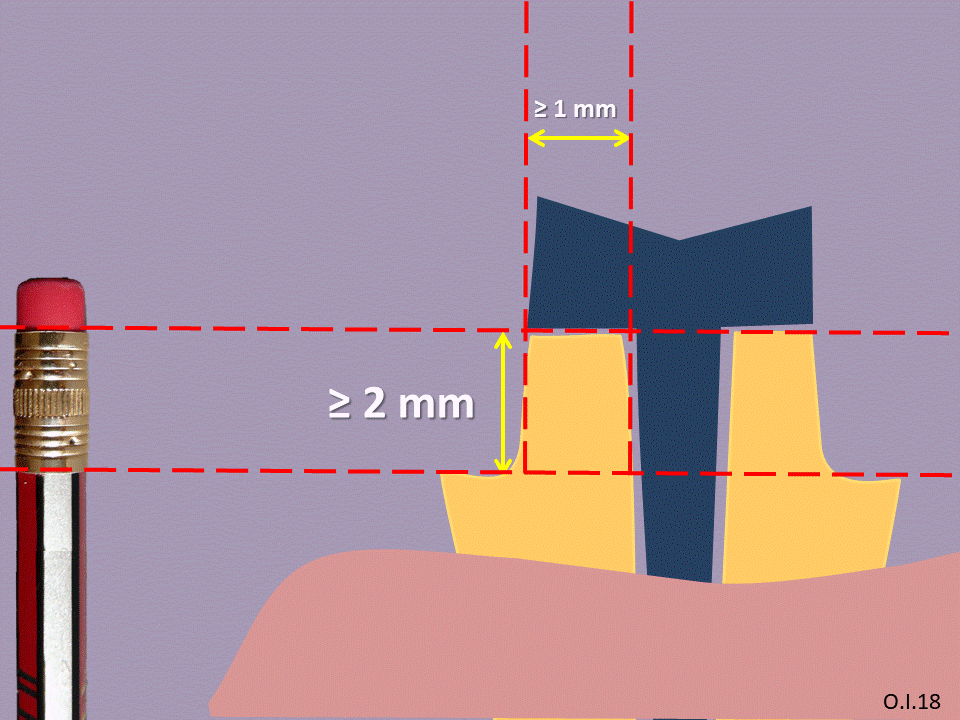
Dimensions for the crown preparation to achieve the "ferrule effect"

=== Special considerations ===
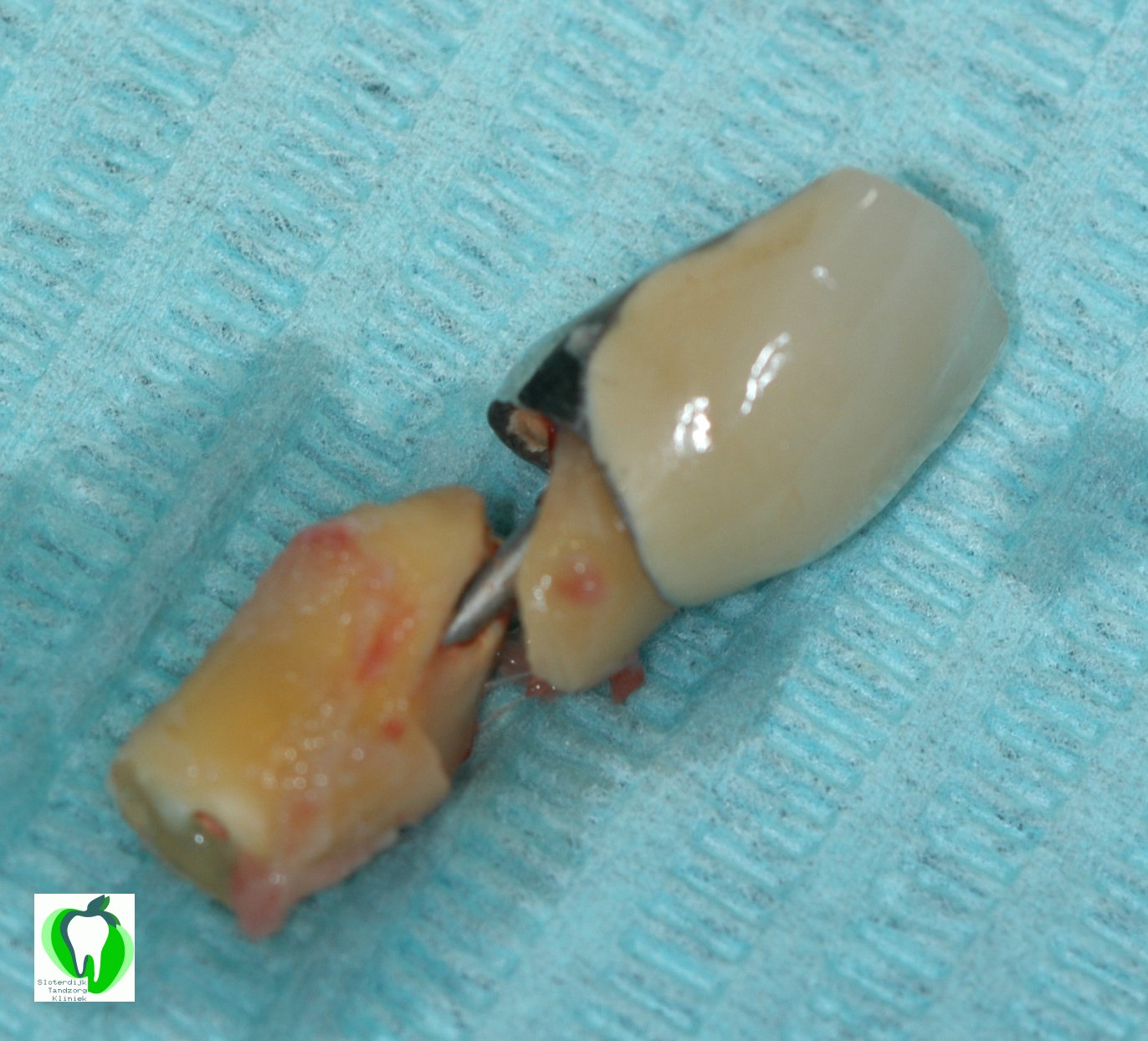
Crown with post and core system displaying a root fracture

==== Ferrule effect ====
Endodontically treated teeth, especially those with little sound tooth tissue, are prone to fractures. The successful clinical outcome for these teeth relies not only on adequate root canal treatment, but also on the type of restorative treatment used, including the use of a post and core system and the type of extra-coronal restoration selected. Some evidence advocates the use of a ferrule to optimise the bio-mechanical behaviour of root-filled teeth, especially where a post and core system needs to be used.

In dentistry, the ferrule effect is, as defined by Sorensen and Engelman (1990), a "360° metal collar of the crown surrounding the parallel walls of the dentine extending coronal to the shoulder of the preparation". Like the ferrule of a pencil which encircles the junction between the rubber and the pencil shaft, the ferrule effect is believed to minimise the concentration of stresses at the junction of post and core, ultimately providing a protective effect against fractures. It also reduces stress transmission to the root due to non-axial forces applied by the post during placement or during normal function. The ferrule can also help preserve the hermetic seal of the luting cement. It has been suggested that protection acquired by the use of a ferrule occurs due to the ferrule resisting functional lever forces, wedging effect of tapered posts and lateral forces during post insertion. To make full use of the ferrule effect, the preparation needs to allow for a continuous band of dentine which should be at least 2 mm in height from the level of the preparation margin and with the band being at least 1 mm in thickness.

It has been shown, however, that whilst the absence of a 360° ferrule can increase the risk of fracture of root-filled teeth restored with fiber post and cores and crowns, having insufficient coronal walls poses an even greater one.

==== Stainless steel crowns for posterior primary dentition ====
Stainless steel preformed metal crowns are the treatment of choice for the restoration of posterior primary teeth. A systemic review found that it has the highest success rate (96.1%). In order to accept a stainless steel crown, the entire occlusal surface should be reduced by 1–1.5 mm and interproximally contacts should be cleared by cutting a thin mesial and distal portion or slice subgingivally by holding the tip of a thin high-speed bur at 15–20° relative to the long axis of the tooth, to avoid the creation of a shoulder. No preparation of the buccal or lingual/palatal surfaces is required. Stainless steel crowns can be made esthetic by veneering composite using the open face technique or composite veneering done after sand-blasting SSCs. Also, composite veneering can be done after preparing retentive grooves on the buccal surface of stainless steel crowns.

==== Hall technique ====
The Hall technique is a non-invasive treatment for decayed posterior primary teeth where caries are sealed under a preformed stainless steel crown. This technique requires no tooth preparation.

== Construction and fit of temporary crown restorations ==
It is very likely that once a tooth has been prepared and whilst waiting for the definitive restoration, the tooth preparation is fitted with a temporary crown.

=== Need for temporary restorations ===
Temporisation is important after tooth preparation in order to:

- Protect from and prevent bacterial invasion of newly exposed dentinal tubules, leading to pulpal inflammation and necrosis;
- Prevent gingival growth in the area created by the tooth preparation;
- Allow area to be cleaned more effectively, decreasing the incidence of bleeding and gingival inflammation at the time of fitting definitive restoration;
- Maintain occlusal and approximal contacts therefore preventing over-eruption, rotation and closing of spaces;
- Aesthetic reasons;

Temporary crowns can also play a diagnostic role in treatment planning where there is a need for occlusal, aesthetic or periodontal changes.

=== Types of temporary crowns ===
Temporary crowns can be described by:

- The expected or planned duration of temporisation:
  - Short term
  - Medium term
  - Long term
- The way or the place the temporary restoration is made:
  - Direct or chair-side
  - Indirect or laboratory-made
- The aesthetics or look of the material of construction
  - Metal
    - Cast
    - Preformed
  - Tooth coloured
    - Plastic pre-formed (e.g. polycarboxylate and acrylic)
    - Resin composites

==== Duration of temporisation ====
Temporary crowns can be described as short-term, if used for a few days, medium-term, if their planned use for several weeks and long-term if their planned use is for several months. The choice in length of temporisation often relates to the complexity of restorative work planned. Short-term temporary crowns are generally appropriate for simple restorative cases whilst complex cases involving more than one tooth often require long-term temporary crowns.

==== Direct vs. indirect restorations ====
Temporary crowns can either be direct, if constructed by the dentist in the clinic, or indirect if they are made off-site, usually in a dental laboratory. Generally direct temporary crowns tend to be for short-term use. Where medium-term or long-term temporisation is required, the use of indirect temporary crowns should be considered.

==== Temporary crown materials ====
There are several materials that can be used to construct temporary crowns. Direct temporary crowns are either made using metal or plastic pre-formed crowns, chemically cured or light-cured resins or resin composites. Indirect restorations are either made of chemically cured acrylic, heat-cured acrylic or cast in metal.

Material	Advantages	Disadvantages	Indications
Preformed crowns
Tooth coloured
Polycarbonate	Good aesthetics	Needs relining with self-cured resin	Direct restorations for all teeth, especially anteriors
Acrylic	Good aesthetics	Needs relining with self-cured resin	Direct restorations for all teeth, especially anteriors
Metal
Aluminum	Strong	Poor aesthetics; Needs relining with self-cured resin	Direct restorations for posterior teeth
Stainless steel	Strong	Poor aesthetics; Needs relining with self-cured resin; Any kind of steel prevents the use of MRI for diagnosis in case of trauma or disease	Direct restorations for posterior teeth
Nickel Chromium	Strong	Poor aesthetics; Needs relining with self-cured resin	Direct restorations for posterior teeth
Self-cured and light-cured resins
Polymethyl methacrylate (Self or heat cured)	Strong; High wear resistance; Good aesthetics; Easy to modify	Polymerisation shrinkage - can affect fit; Setting reaction exothermic - can cause damage to dental pulp; Unreacted monomer can damage gingivae and pulp	Indirect temporary crowns, all teeth
Polyethyl methacrylate	Setting produces less heat and shrinkage than polymethyl methacrylates - can be used in the mouth	Poorer strength, wear resistance, aesthetics and colour stability than polymethyl methacrylates	Reliner for pre-formed crowns
Bisacryl composite	Setting produces less heat and shrinkage than other resins; Better marginal fit; OK aesthetics; Better colour stability than polyethyl methacrylates	Stains easily if unreacted surface layer not removed; brittle in thin sections; Difficult to modify/add to	Direct restorations all teeth
Urethane dimethacrylate (Light cured)	Aesthetics acceptable; Light cured; Good mechanical properties; Can be relined more easily than bysacryl composites	Expensive; Requires matrix; Setting reaction exothermic; Polymerisation shrinkage high	Direct restorations all teeth
Restorative composite	Excellent aesthetics; Can be used with or without a matrix; Does not require temporary cement	Expensive; Placement and removal is time-consuming	Direct restorations anterior teeth

=== Cementation of temporary crowns ===
The purpose of temporary luting agents is to fill the space between the crown preparation and the temporary restoration. Unlike cementation of definitive crowns, temporary crowns should be relatively easy to remove. Adhesive cements should not be used and softer cements are preferred to allow for the easy removal of both temporary cements and crowns. This is crucial as remnants of temporary cement left on the tooth surface can compromise gingival health and interfere with accurate seating of the final restoration and permanent cement attachment. Provisional cements should also be strong enough to avoid being deformed or fractured during the provisional period.

Zinc Oxide Eugenol (ZOE) temporary luting cements

These are commonly used because of their low tensile strength and lack of adhesion which provides ease of removal. These products should not be used when resin composite is to be planned for bonding the definitive crown as eugenol is able to infiltrate and diffuse through dentine; contaminating tooth surface and compromising bonding by inhibiting polymerisation of resin. Commercially available products include RelyX Temp E (3M ESPE), Temp-Bond (Kerr) and Flow Temp (Premier Dental Products).

Non-eugenol temporary luting cements

Non-eugenol cements replace eugenol with several types of carboxylic acids which do not inhibit definitive cementation. These cements are compatible with temporary resin materials and definitive resin cements and have increased retention when compared to ZOE containing cements. Examples of commercially available products include RelyX Temp NE (3M ESPE) and Temp-Bond NE (Kerr).

Polycarboxylate temporary luting cements

This hydrophilic cement has the benefit of minimal effects on temporary resin containing agents and weak adhesion to tooth tissue which increases ease of removal. This cement is the easiest to clean out of all the provisional cement types. Examples include Ultradent and Hy-Bond (Shofu Dental).

Resin temporary luting cements

The advantages of these cements include superior aesthetics, greater strength, superb retention and ease of cleaning. However, amongst the drawbacks of this cement is the higher rate of discolouration, microleakage and odour experienced. Commercially available examples of temporary resins cements include Systemp.link (Ivoclar Vivadent), Temp-Bond Clear (Kerr) and ImProv (Nobel Biocare).

== Tooth preparation impressions ==
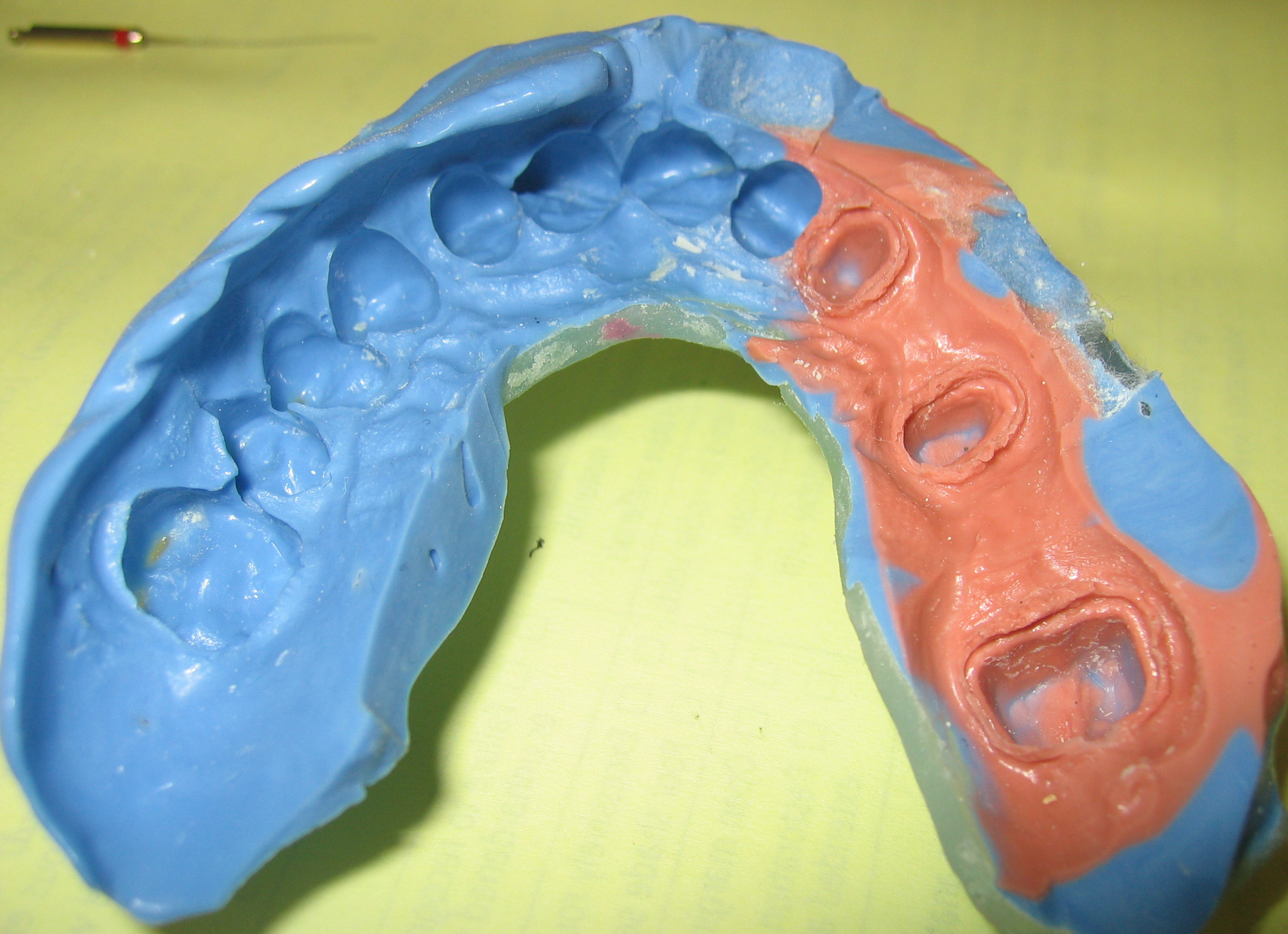
A full-arch addition silicone (polyvinyl siloxane) impression using the "wash impression" technique

Once the tooth has been prepared to the required dimensions, an accurate and dimensionally stable record or impression should be made of the preparation or dental implant, the surrounding hard and soft tissues, and the opposing dental arch. This allows the resulting restoration to conform to the required dimensions and achieve an accurate fit while minimizing the need for chairside modifications.

Impressions can be made digitally or by conventional technique. With regards to conventional impression techniques, the materials selected should have appropriate physical properties and handling characteristics to allow enough detail reproduction and durability when casting a model, including the ability to withstand effective decontamination procedures. Generally, impressions of the arch where the preparation is made are in addition silicone using the "wash impression" technique; impressions of the opposing arch are made in alginate.

Digital impressions can be made using dedicated optical scanners. A review suggests that digital impressions provide the same accuracy as conventional impressions and are found to be more comfortable for patients and easier for dental practitioners.

== Crown manufacture using CAD/CAM ==
- CEREC

=== Chairside CAD/CAM dentistry ===
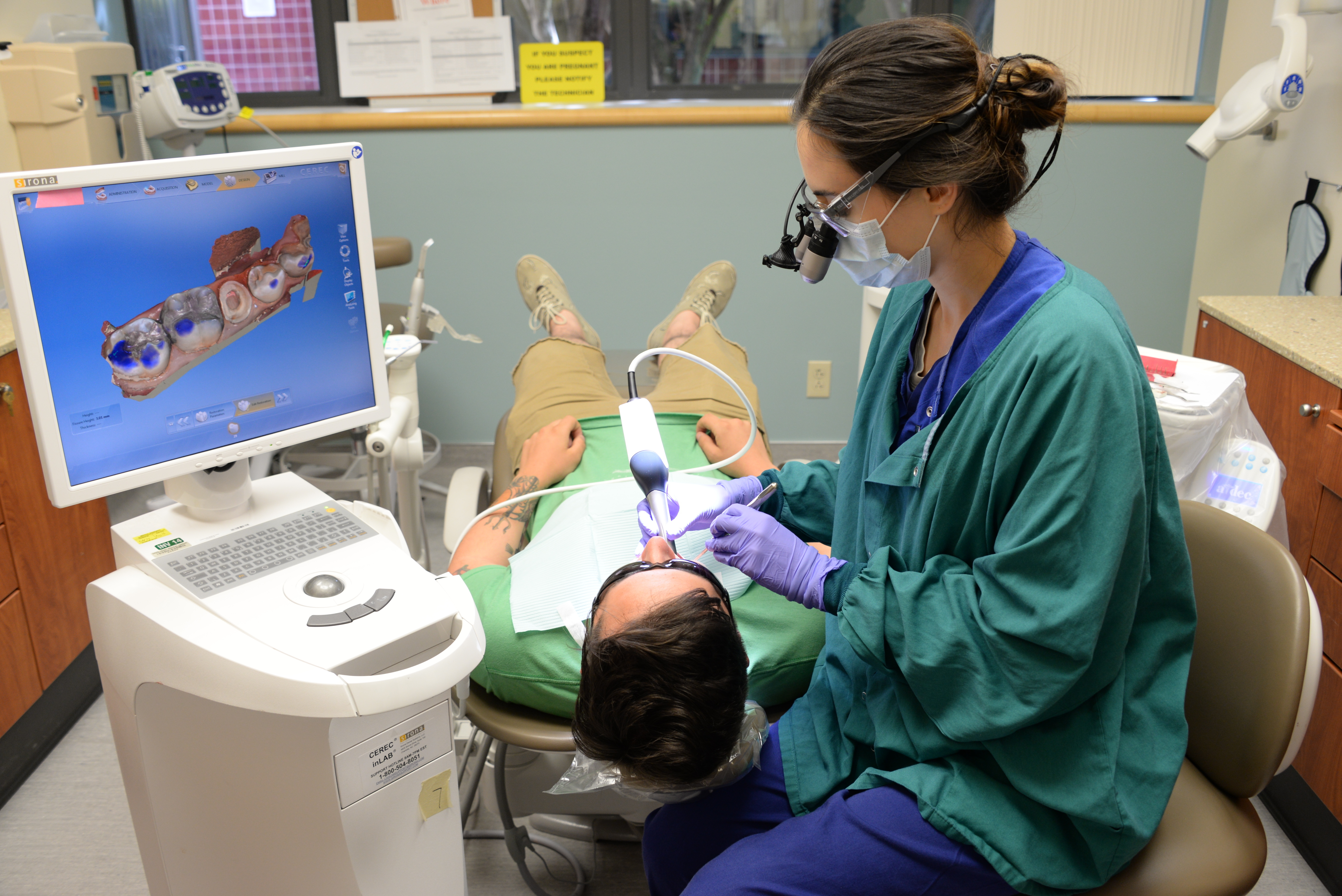
Use of CAD/CAM in dental clinic

The CAD/CAM method of fabricating all-ceramic restorations is by electronically capturing and storing a photographic image of the prepared tooth and, using computer technology, crafting a 3D restoration design that conforms to all the necessary specifications of the proposed inlay, onlay or single-unit crown; there is no impression. After selecting the proper features and making various decisions on the computerized model, the dentist directs the computer to send the information to a local milling machine. This machine will then use its specially designed diamond burs to mill the restoration from a solid ingot of a ceramic of pre-determined shade to match the patient's tooth. After about 20 minutes, the restoration is complete, and the dentist sections it from the remainder of the unmilled ingot and tries it in the mouth. If the restoration fits well, the dentist can cement the restoration immediately. A dental CAD/CAM machine costs roughly $100,000, with continued purchase of ceramic ingots and milling burs. Because of high costs, the usual and customary fee for making a CAD/CAM crown in the dentist's office is often slightly higher than having the same crown made in a dental laboratory.

Typically, over 95% of the restorations made using dental CAD/CAM and Vita Mark I and Mark II blocks are still clinically successful after five years. Further, at least 90% of restorations still function successfully after 10 years. Advantages of the Mark II blocks over ceramic blocks include: they wear down as fast as natural teeth, their failure loads are very similar to those of natural teeth, and the wear pattern of Mark II against enamel is similar to that of enamel against enamel.

In recent years, the technological advances afforded by CAD/CAM dentistry offer viable alternatives to the traditional crown restoration in many cases. Where the traditional indirectly fabricated crown requires a tremendous amount of surface area to retain the normal crown, potentially resulting in the loss of healthy, natural tooth structure for this purpose, the all-porcelain CAD/CAM crown can be predictably used with significantly less surface area. As a matter of fact, the more enamel that is retained, the greater the likelihood of a successful outcome. As long as the thickness of porcelain on the top, chewing portion of the crown is 1.5mm thick or greater, the restoration can be expected to be successful. The side walls which are normally totally sacrificed in the traditional crown are generally left far more intact with the CAD/CAM option. In regards to post and core buildups, these are generally contraindicated in CAD/CAM crowns as the resin bonding materials do best bonding the etched porcelain interface to the etched enamel/dentin interfaces of the natural tooth itself. The crownlay is also an excellent alternative to the post and core buildup when restoring a root canal-treated tooth.

== Crown removal ==
Crown removal with WamKey - part 1

Crown removal with WamKey

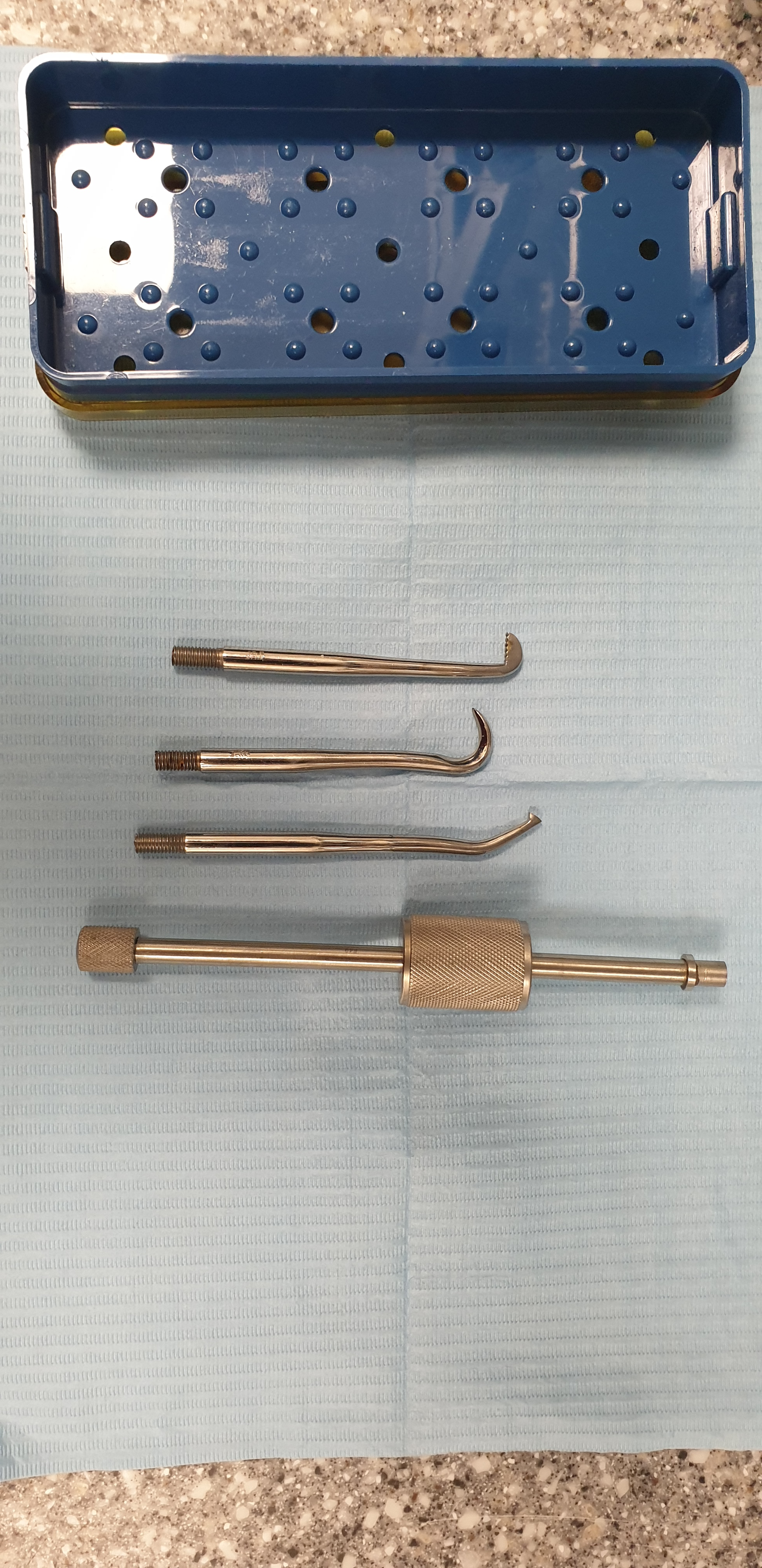
Sliding hammer, a weighted tapping device

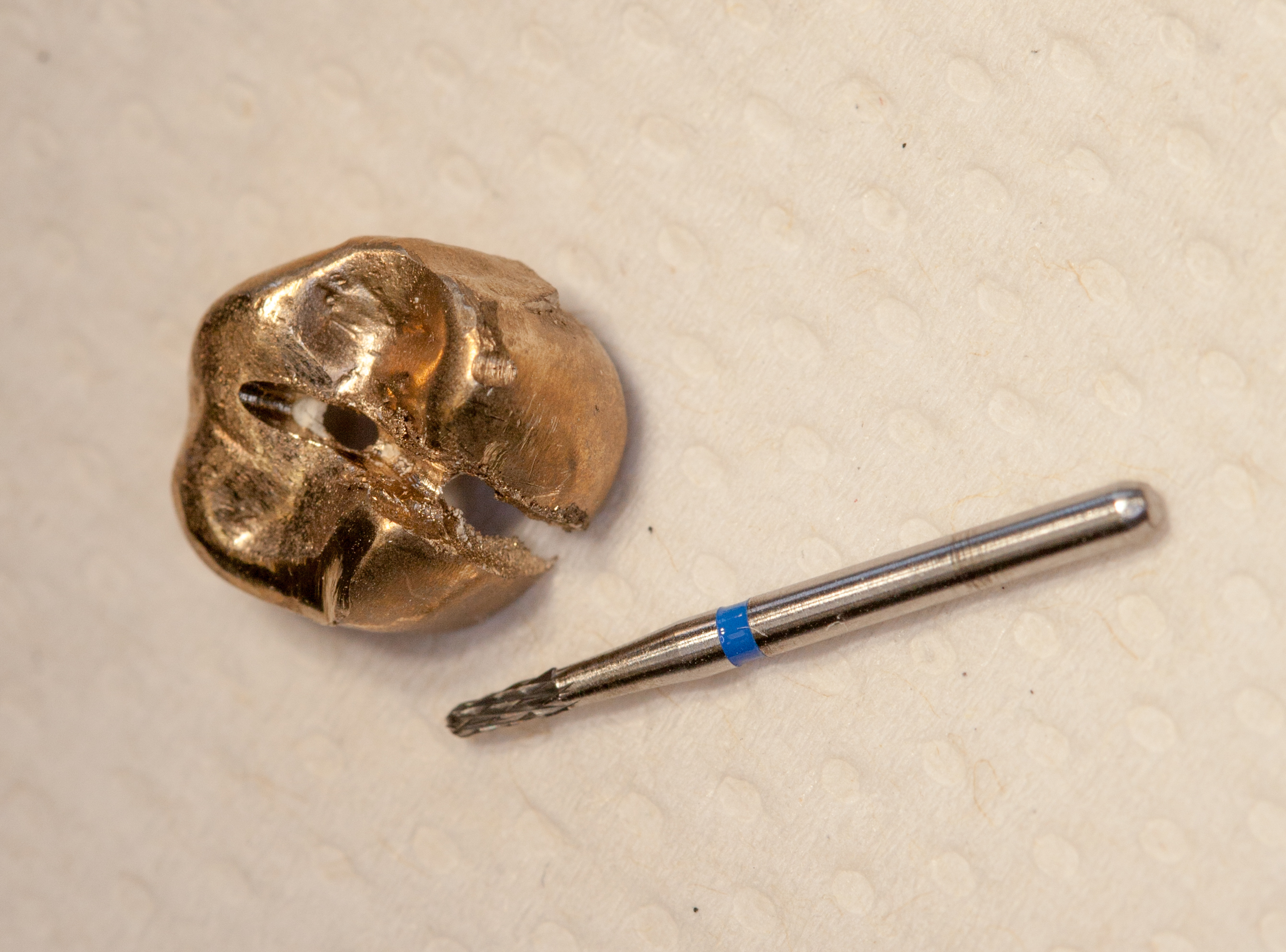
Gold shell crown sectioned using a tungsten carbide bur

At times it may be necessary to remove crown restorations to enable treatment of the tooth tissue underneath, especially to enable for non-surgical endodontic treatment of a necrotic or previously treated pulp. Several methods are available and the choice is guided normally by the nature and quality of the crown restoration., i.e., whether it is to be retained or to be replaced.

Factors to consider when deciding whether to retain or remove the crown include:

- Replacement cost (time and financial)
- Aesthetic
- Ease of removal
- Marginal integrity
- Planned restoration (including change from a crown to a bridge, or adapting the crown design to act as abutment for a partial denture)
- Access required to treat the tooth safely and effectively (especially with regards to access cavity design)

Temporary crowns are easy to remove and replace therefore do not pose problems.

Before removing definitive crown restorations it is important to plan for a provisional crown, especially if the crown to be removed is expected to be damaged in the process. This usually involves making an impression of the crown so a temporary can be fabricated chair-side or made by the dental laboratory. Several tools and methods are available, which can be classified by how conservative they are to the crown. Normally the tooth, if heavily damaged, should be restored prior to a new crown (whether temporary or definitive) is fitted.

Methods to remove crowns assorted by how conservative they are to the crown restoration
Conservative	Semi-conservative	Destructive
Matrix bands Ultrasonic Forceps and crown tractors Tapping and pneumatic tools Sticky sweet method	Wedging devices Metalift crown and bridge removal system	Burs

=== Matrix bands ===
Application of a matrix band which is burnished into the undercuts and pulled vertically.

=== Ultrasonic ===
An ultrasonic tip can be applied to a cast metal crown to disrupt the cement lute. This method should be avoided with ceramic restorations as this may lead to fractures.

=== Forceps and crown tractors ===
Crown tractors and forceps can be used to grip the restoration and dislodge it from the tooth preparation. Crown tractors are designed to have rubber grips and powder on their beaks to reduce the risk of damaging ceramic restorations. Crown tractors are quite effective in removing crowns luted with temporary cements.

=== Sticky sweet method or Richwill crown and bridge remover ===
A thermoplastic pliable resin is softened in warm water then placed on the occlusal surface of the crown to be removed. The patient is then asked to bite down, compressing the resin block to two-thirds of its original thickness. The patient is then asked to open the mouth quickly, which should generate enough force to displace the restoration. This method however, is not very effective and has a risk of damaging restorations on or accidentally extracting the opposing tooth. Therefore, before using this method, it is important to look at the state of the opposing tooth.

=== Tapping and pneumatic tools ===
Sliding hammers work by using a tip to engage the crown margin and sliding the weight along the shaft and tapping this to loosen the restoration. Several versions are available. Some are weighted, others are spring loaded. This system is uncomfortable for the patient and is not always successful. It is also contraindicated for periodontically involved teeth, as it can cause unwanted extractions. This system can also damage the ceramic margins.

=== Wedging devices ===
A slot is cut using the side of a long tapered bur, normally on the buccal surface of the crown, all the way into the cement lute. A flat plastic instrument, straight Warrick James, Couplands elevators or dedicated systems such as the WamKey, is inserted into the slot created to wedge the crown apart from the tooth.

=== Metalift crown and bridge removal system ===
Based on the "jack-screw" principle, the Metalift system works by drilling a precision channel through the occlusal surface of a cast restoration, then with a special bur, the area around the periphery of the hole is undermined before a threaded screw is wound into the space. As the screw comes in contact with the core of the restoration, the continued rotation of the screw results in a jacking force that displaces the crown from the preparation. This system can be used to remove both all metal crowns and metal-ceramic crowns, although with metal-ceramic crowns care should be taken to remove enough ceramic from the area where the hole created to reduce the chances of fracture. The minimum thickness of metal required for the lifting action is approximately 0.5mm. The damage can repaired with a plastic filling material.

=== Burs ===
The crown can be simply sectioned using a bur.

== History ==
There is evidence of gold dental prosthesis dating back to the Etruscans, when gold crowns and rudimentary bridges were in use- around 700BC - 1st Century BC. By the Middle Ages, dental practices had declined in complexity in many places, but attempts at prosthetic dental repair remained in various forms.

Significant advances came in the 18th and 19th centuries. In the early 1700s, European dentists began using methods such as dowel-pins to anchor carved bone or ivory crowns to tooth stumps. By the mid-1800s, use of metal materials and improved cements made crowns more practical and durable.

== See also ==
- Filling (dentistry)
- Pediatric crowns
