= Nankali post and core classification =

Classification in dentistry

The Nankali post and core classification is the most advanced classification that is used in restorative dentistry for grouping different types of post and cores.

== Nankali post and core classification ==
Here Nankali post and core classification is illustrated. As it can be observed all systems are divided into main two groups prefabricated (which is made in factories) and those posts that are made in laboratory or in surgeries. In the next step each group is divided into two subgroups according to their counter-sink constructions including their position.

In the other steps either the system is symmetrical or non-symmetrical is another important fact that is pointed out.

In the Nankali post and core classification the outline surfaces, threaded, smooth and serrated are profoundly discussed, in addition to the other mentioned directions.

Because posts can be made from different justified dental materials such as Stainless Steel, Titanium, Titanium Alloy, Gold-Plated brass, Carbon and Ceramic, to avoid complications in understanding this classification the choice of material is not placed.

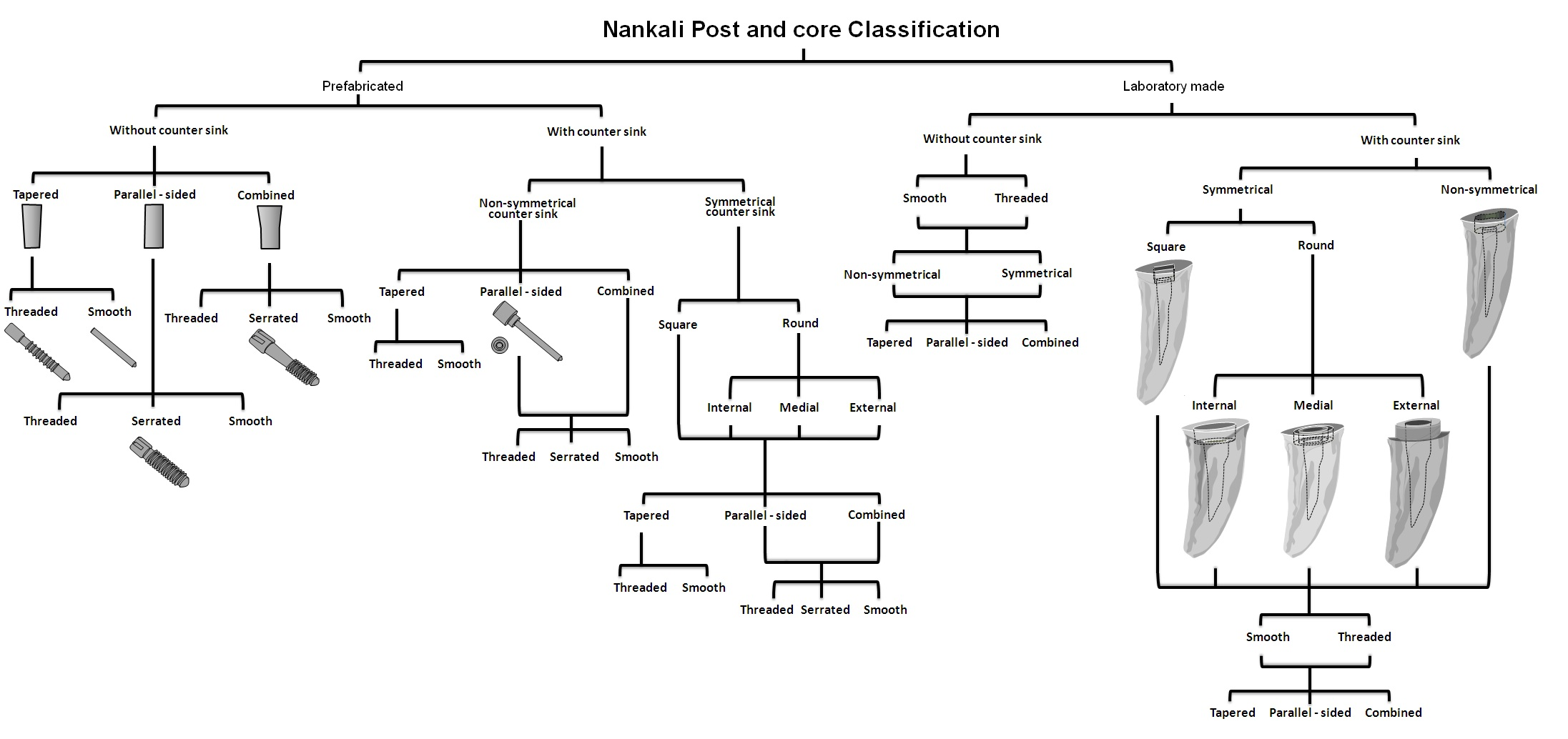
Nankali Post and Core Classification

All posts and cores can also be made as a one part or more parts.

== Advantages ==
This classification answers different questions related to the posts and cores which help professionals to clarify the clinical indications more appropriately.

Another important advantage of this classification is that it gives dentists ability to compare the systems in a very clear way, which may help them to plans their treatment faster and properly.

== Disadvantages ==
Because it is tried to cover the maximum required information, the size of this classification became large and it required time to analyse it, yet, after understanding the classification it became very useful and simple.

== About other classifications ==
There are a number of posts with different designs and clinical indications that are used in restorative dentistry and due to this wide range of provided posts and cores, professionals are not any more able to use the general conventional clinical indication which were discussed similarly in many referral books. This is the reason that posts and cores' classification starts to play an important role in understanding and verifying the type of these micro-prosthesis.

The popularity of these classifications in the world is not similar and they are mainly related to the professionals, referral books and publications that is used in particular country. Language is another issue which change the conditions. For instance, in some countries, a number of posts are banded and in some others they are not approved yet or unknown to be used by dentists.

Post and cores classification is according to their authors and still it is used. Yet, with this classification there is repetition of the systems and also the minimum required information about the system is required to be able to recognize a particular post. Furthermore, you musr put all the names in the posts' classification, though doing so credits the original authors. Having in mind that there are many authors, here a partial example of this classification is illustrated.

- Classification of post and cores according to their authors:

1-Ahmmedov

2-Davis

3-L.V. Illinoi-Markasian (Л. В. Ильиной – Маркосян)

4-A.I. Kats (А.Я. Кац)

5-Kopeikin (Копейкин)

6-A. Nankali

7-Orton

8-V. N. Parshin

9-Richmond

10-Sharogorodski (Шаргородски)

11-Shiragodski (Ширакой)

12-D.N. Sitrin

13-...

- Classification of post and cores according to their method of production:

1-Pre-fabricated

2-Cast made.

- Classification of post and cores according to their outlines:

1-Parallel

2-Tapered

3-Serrated

Classification of post and cores according to their surface:

1-Simple (straight)

2-Formed (shaped)

== History ==
In 1998, Dr. Ali Nankali, as one of the people who were interested in restorative dentistry, started to work on application of posts and cores by analysing and studying the available systems and in 2003 after five years research he modified some of the existing classifications, and as a result he proposed to the scientific board of the Orthopaedic and Implant department of the National Medical University a new classification to explain some misunderstandings.

Using mathematical models and cast models, Dr. Ali Nankali was able to analyse, compare and categorise the structures in different ways which was a part of this study. Thus, the Nankali's post and core classification is based on designs, methods of production, retention/resistance systems and clinical indications.

There was an established interesting outcome, which was explained that many dentists do not use posts in their appropriate way, which means they apply them in the way that they understand by themselves, and this fact causes two main problems, consuming time and failing the post.
