= Vertical root fracture =

- Specialty: Dentistry

Vertical root fractures are a type of fracture of a tooth. They can be characterized by an incomplete or complete fracture line that extends through the long axis of the root toward the apex. Vertical root fractures represent between 2 and 5 percent of crown/root fractures. The greatest incidence occurs in endodontically treated teeth, and in patients older than 40 years of age.

The occurrence of a complete vertical root fracture is often catastrophic for the individual tooth as tooth extraction is usually the only reasonable treatment.

Vertical root fracture is more likely where teeth have undergone extensive prior treatment. It is thought that excessive removal of dentine during procedures such as root canal treatment weakens the tooth. For this reason excessive canal shaping should be avoided. Fracturing may be caused by excessive forces placed on the tooth, such as during compaction of gutta-percha during the obturation phase of endodontics. Trauma can also cause crack formation.

== Symptoms and signs ==
Symptoms include: Short duration pain on biting, sensitivity to temperature change. Fracture lines may be visibly evident. Transillumination may reveal unseen fractures. Radiographic changes such as radiolucencies in the region of the fracture may be seen.

== Diagnosis ==
Vertical root fracture can be a difficult diagnosis to make where the fracture line is not evident.Use of cone-beam computerized tomography has been described.

== Regenerative Dentistry ==
~~A recent discovery shows that dentin can be regenerated, if the patient can be provided with some lithium which is available in many foods such as tomato and potato. Inside the dentin is the pulp chamber, which contains the nerves and blood vessels; new odontoblast-like cells can be produced in response to damage or trauma.~~
