= Apicoectomy =

Endodontic root end surgery

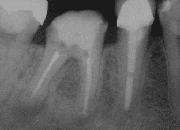
- X-ray of a tooth after root end surgery
- ICD-9-CM: 23.7
- MeSH: D001047

A root end surgery, also known as apicoectomy (apico- + -ectomy), apicectomy (apic- + -ectomy), retrograde root canal treatment (cf. orthograde root canal treatment) or root-end filling, is an endodontic surgical procedure whereby a tooth's root tip is removed and a root end cavity is prepared and filled with a biocompatible material. It is an example of a periradicular surgery.

An apicoectomy is necessary when conventional root canal therapy has failed and a re-treatment was already unsuccessful or is not advised. Removal of the root tip is indicated to remove the entire apical delta ensuring no uncleaned missed anatomy. The only alternative may be extraction followed by prosthetic replacement with a denture, dental bridge or dental implant.

State-of-the-art procedures make use of microsurgical endodontic techniques, such as a dental operating microscope, micro instruments, ultrasonic preparation tips and calcium-silicate based filling materials.

In an apicoectomy, only the tip of the root is removed. This is in contrast to root resection, where an entire root is removed, and hemisection, where a root together with its overlying portion of the crown are separated from the rest of the tooth and optionally removed.

== Materials ==
The primary aim of any endodontic treatment is to disinfect the root canal system in order to reduce the bacterial load as much as possible, and to seal the system to prevent ingress or egress of bacteria or their byproducts. Failure is often due to leakage, and therefore any materials used to seal the end of the root must provide a good seal. It is also important that they are biocompatible; that is, that they are non-carcinogenic and non-toxic to the surrounding tissues or the body as a whole. They must also be stable in moisture and at body temperature. It is beneficial if they are easy to handle, as they are placed in small amounts under technically demanding conditions, and if they are easily identified on radiographs (i.e. radio-opaque). Below is a list of some of the commonly used root-end filling materials. This list is by no means exhaustive.

Amalgam is widely used as a root-end filling, and meets many of the desired criteria. It is easy to handle, easy to see on radiographs, not sensitive to moisture, and stable at body temperature. Amalgam provides a relatively good seal if placed correctly. There have been some concerns about toxicity, as amalgam contains mercury as an ingredient, but there is very little evidence to support these. However, there is evidence that mercury is toxic. Dentists are required to handle mercury very carefully and put mercury-based waste in special biohazard containers.

Composite resin is commonly used as a filling material due to its aesthetic qualities and ability to effectively bond to tooth structure, especially enamel. It is less commonly used as a root-end filling material, as its placement is technique sensitive, particularly to moisture. Moisture contamination will result in a weakened bond that is very susceptible to leakage and subsequent failure. There is some evidence that, when placed correctly, composite resin can produce high success rates.

Mineral trioxide aggregate (MTA) is a cement containing mineral oxides which absorb water to form a colloidal gel, which solidifies over a period of approximately 4 hours. It has proven very popular as a root-end filling material and has shown generally high success rates. MTA produces a high pH environment, which is bactericidal, and may stimulate osteoblasts to produce bone to fill in any defects caused by infection.

Modified versions of zinc oxide eugenol cement (ZOE) cement, such as IRM or Super EBA, have high compressive strength, high tensile strength, neutral pH, and low solubility.

== Success rates ==
Reported success rates for apicoectomy vary widely. Studies generally focus on one material or method of treatment compared to another, so it can be difficult to obtain any good evidence on the overall success rate. A meta-analysis published in 2010 indicated an overall success rate of 85-95% for surgical endodontic treatment using a modern technique, with the evidence level rated high. A similar systematic review published in 2009 suggested an overall success rate of 77.8% for surgical endodontic treatment at 2–4 years, falling to 71.8% at 4–6 years, and 62.9% at 6+ years. There are many factors which will affect the likelihood of success of apicoectomy. If performed correctly, it can be highly successful in preventing loss of teeth which would otherwise be extracted.
