= Periradicular surgery =

Any dental surgery on the surface of a tooth root

In the dental specialty of endodontics, periradicular surgery is surgery to the external root surface. Examples of periradicular surgery include apicoectomy, root resection, repair of root perforation or resorption defects, removal of broken fragments of the tooth or a filling material, and exploratory surgery to look for root fractures.

Symptoms may be due to infection in the periradicular tissue around a root-treated tooth, which can impede healing of the tooth after conventional root canal treatment. After removing the pulp, the aim of endodontic treatment is to seal the pulpal space to prevent further bacterial contamination and allow healing of the periradicular tissue. Success rates for root-canal treatment range from 47 to 97 percent; failures may be due to spaces in the root-canal filling, a root filling which is too short or a preexisting periapical lesion.

Treatment options are nonsurgical root-canal re-treatment or periradicular surgery. Although accessing and cleaning the pulp chamber and canals would be easier with the former, it is contraindicated in some patients.

The stages of periradicular surgery are:

1. Local anaesthesia
2. Flap design
3. Bone removal
4. Curettage
5. Apicectomy
6. Retrograde preparation and filling
7. Wound closure

== Indications ==
Periradicular surgery should be very considered where previous endodontic treatment has failed, and possible re-root treatment is the preferred option. If re-root treatment is not possible, will not correct the problem or patient factors prevent it, periradicular surgery is indicated.

Anatomical deviations preventing access or preparation of canal, including root-canal calcification, pulp stones, severely curved roots, bifurcations, secondary roots, lateral canals, delta apexes, internal and external resorption resistant to conventional treatment and an incomplete apex, may prevent the complete cleaning and preparation of the canal.

Procedural errors include the formation of ledges, perforation of the root or floor of the pulp chamber, extruded root filling material, file breakages, or underfilled canals. These are only indications for periradicular surgery if they cause persistent periapical radiolucency, swelling and pain.

Exploratory surgery that identifies possible root fractures or perforations indicates periradicular surgery.

A biopsy may be used in suspicious or non-healing lesions, or when a patient has uncharacteristic signs and symptoms in periapical areas.

== Contraindications ==
Several factors are considered before periradicular surgery is performed.

Severe systemic disease poses the risk of poor healing after surgery. The patient's attitude towards surgery should also be taken into account.

A tooth is unsuitable for periradicular surgery if it does not have a good periodontal support or coronal seal. It must have enough structure to support restoration. Filling the root canals of the tooth from the crown (orthograde root canal therapy) should be the first treatment option to resolve inflammation caused by the tooth. Periradicular surgery is only considered if the inflammation persists after conventional root canal treatment. A patient's oral hygiene must be considered; poor oral hygiene increases the risk of infection and impairs healing of the surgical site.

The lack of appropriate surgical access to the site contraindicates periradicular surgery; cutting the gum near important anatomical structures, such as neurovascular bundles, risks permanent jaw numbness. Unusual bone structure and root arrangement of the tooth should also be considered.

The surgeon's skill and experience, and the facilities available, should be considered.

== Procedure ==
=== Assessment ===
Assessment before periradicular surgery involves a thorough history and clinical exam, followed by special investigations. Clinical assessment considers a number of factors. Oral hygiene and overall dental condition indicates the patient's motivation for treatment and the tooth's restorative prognosis. Gum health is important to ensure optimum healing and appearance after surgery. Cortical bone thickness, regional anatomy, and root fracture or resorption indicate possible difficulties.

Special investigations include radiography, vitality testing of adjacent teeth and an occlusal loading assessment. Radiography identifies disease presence, including periradicular pathology. A periapical radiograph is usually the radiograph of choice. When examining the tooth which will receive surgery, the quality of the root treatment and canal anatomy (sclerosed or missed canals) is noted. More than one radiograph may be required to indicate possible treatment success. The root filling should be optimal.

The relationship of the tooth to neighbouring structures (the inferior dental nerve, mental foramen and maxillary sinus) or to adjacent roots must be noted, to anticipate operative complications and inform the patient. At least 3 mm of tissue beyond the apex of the roots should be radiographically assessed.

=== Anaesthesia and haemostasis ===
Haemostasis is imperative during surgery to allow optimum visualisation. It is achieved preoperatively with a local anaesthetic. The anaesthetic's adrenaline targets the smooth muscle of arterioles by acting on the alpha adrenergic receptors.

Haemostasis is continued throughout the procedure. The main methods are:

1. Topical epinephrine pellets
2. Ferric sulphate, which forms a plug by agglutinating the blood proteins; however, it is cytotoxic and can cause necrosis of the oral tissues.
3. Calcium sulphate mechanically blocks open vessels and aids bone regeneration.

Bleeding in the bone is also affected by the local anaesthetic's vasoconstriction and topically-applied agents. These topical agents should be removed before closing the surgical site. When the flap has been sutured in position, haemostasis is maintained postoperatively. Digital pressure on a damp gauze controls bleeding and stabilises the flap. An ice pack is recommended (15 minutes on, 30 minutes off) for the first six hours.

=== Flap design ===
Two main flap designs used in endodontic surgery are full and limited mucoperiosteal flaps. Full mucoperiosteal flaps involve an intrasulcular horizontal incision with reflection of the marginal and interdental gingival tissue. They can be two- or three-sided or envelope-shaped. A two-sided (triangular) flap is made with a horizontal, intrasulcular incision and a vertical relieving incision. The first horizontal incision follows the contours of the tooth, cutting the gingival sulcus (including the mesial or distal papilla. The relieving incision begins at the gingival margin and extends to the attached gingiva. For posterior teeth, the horizontal incision is always mesial. A three-sided (rectangular) flap is made with a horizontal, intrasulcular incision and two vertical relieving incisions. Although this flap increases surgical access, it is difficult to re-approximate the tissue. An envelope (horizontal) incision is a horizontal, intrasulcular incision with no vertical relieving incision. This design provides little surgical access to the root surface.

Limited mucoperiosteal flaps have a submarginal horizontal or horizontally-oriented incision, and do not include marginal or interdental tissues. A submarginal curved (semilunar) incision begins in the alveolar mucosa, dips down into the attached gingiva and extends back into the alveolar mucosa. Semilunar flaps have poor healing potential, and often lead to scarring. A submarginal scalloped (Ochsenbein-Luebke) flap is similar to the rectangular flap, but the horizontal incision is in the attached gingiva. It is scalloped, following the contour of the gingival margins below. This flap is also prone to delayed healing and scarring.

=== Wound closure ===
Before closing the wound, it should be well-irrigated (to prevent infection) and the flap compressed to reduce the risk of haematoma. The flap is re-approximated, and the first suture should be placed in the interdental papilla. After suturing the flap, a sterile damp gauze should be compressed on the wound for several minutes; an ice pack can be used (15 minutes on, 30 minutes off) by the patient. Sutures should be removed two to four days after surgery, depending on type.

== Complications and management ==
Periradicular surgery has a risk of complications, which can be minimised by the surgeon. By identifying and managing any complications, long-term damage is usually prevented.

Pain and swelling are common, and can be managed with prescription analgesics. A long-acting local anaesthetic may provide relief immediately after surgery. Swelling can be minimised by applying pressure with an ice pack for four to six hours after surgery. Ecchymosis (bruising) may occur, but it is self-limiting and usually resolves within two weeks after surgery.

Damage to blood vessels during surgery can lead to haemorrhage; severe haemorrhage is rare but serious. Although mild haemorrhage is relatively common and not life-threatening, it may affect treatment outcome. Haemorrhaging may be prevented with adequate haemostasis, essential to improve visualisation of the site (minimising operating time and providing an optimal environment for placing filling materials. Local anaesthetic, with an appropriate vasoconstrictor, is used during endodontic surgery to achieve anaesthesia and haemostasis. Assuming no contraindications, the anaesthetic of choice is two-percent lidocaine with 1:100,000 adrenaline. Mild bleeding is common, and can be controlled by digital compression or ligation of the vessel.

Infection of the surgical site, which may cause secondary haemorrhaging, cellulitis or abscess, can result from poor surgical technique, poor oral hygiene, or smoking. Prevention of infection is promoted by advising the patient to maintain oral hygiene and the use of an antiseptic mouthwash, such as chlorhexidine, immediately before and after surgery. In the event of systemic involvement or with immunocompromised patients, systemic antibiotics can be prescribed.

== Outcomes ==
Since a range of benchmarks has been used to assess the outcome of periradicular surgery, comparisons are challenging; the classification most published papers adopt is by Rud et al, which evaluates success radiographically. Clinical criteria have also been considered, as outlined by the Royal College of Surgeons of England.

RCS outcome guidelines for surgical endodontics
Outcome	Clinical	Radiological
Successful	Previous signs and symptoms resolved	Regular or slightly-wider PDL Previous periapical radiolucency reduced (or resolved), with normal replacement of bone and lamina dura. Sound roots, without resorption
Incomplete	Previous signs and symptoms resolved	Some bone surrounding root of tooth, with gradual replacement but incomplete healing Periapical radiolucency still present
Uncertain	Indefinite symptoms - slight ache (or discomfort) associated with tooth in question	Some bone surrounding root of tooth, with gradual replacement but incomplete healing Periapical radiolucency still present.
Unsuccessful	Unresolved signs and symptoms associated with tooth in question	No bony replacement surrounding root of tooth

If periapical surgery is unsuccessful, the cause(s) of failure must be determined before further treatment. Follow-up surgery is usually less successful (35.7 percent) and is not recommended.

Options to repeat periapical surgery are:

- Monitoring: Advisable if the patient is symptom-free but has persistent radiographic indications of disease
- Tooth extraction
- Further root canal treatment

=== Root canal filling ===
Periraduclar surgery is necessary if root canal treatment fails. Its outcome depends on a number of factors, one of which is the root-canal filling. The filling promotes cementum and bone formation, blocks bacteria, and is a barrier for the root canal. Inflammation of the periradicular site due to bacteria could cause recovery to deteriorate and induce periradicular infection. Careful evaluation of root canal filling material is required to optimise healing after the procedure.

Amalgam filling was the recommended material for root-end fillings until the 1990s, when safety concerns (leakage, toxicity, and corrosion) prompted re-evaluation of its use. Calcium-enriched mixture (CEM) cement and mineral trioxide aggregate (MTA) are considered more suitable, since they enhance periradicular tissue regeneration.

MTA was introduced in 1993. Although it prevents leakage and is biocompatible, it has questionable antibacterial properties, a long setting time (about three hours), manipulates poorly and is expensive. CEM cement is superior to MTA as a root-end filling material; it has greater antibacterial effects, a shorter setting time, less film thickness and a smaller particle size. Compared to other root-end canal filling materials (eg amalgam, zinc oxide eugenol and intermediate restorative material), the long term effectiveness of MTA is inconclusive.

== See also ==
- Specialty (dentistry)
