= Ralph Frederick Sommer =

Ralph Frederick Sommer (1898 – 1971) is known as one of the two leading pioneers in the development of endodontics. He is also noted as a pioneer in the treatment of root canal infections and the development of the root canal operation.

At the University of Michigan, Sommer was a faculty member (1924–1968) as well as Chair of the Department of Endodontics at the University of Michigan. He also held status as the charter member and second president of the American Association of Endodontists.
