= Dental specialty =

BDS, Mphil

In the United States and Canada, there are twelve recognized dental specialties in which some dentists choose to train and practice, in addition to or instead of general dentistry. In the United Kingdom and Australia, there are thirteen.

To become a specialist requires training in a residency or advanced graduate training program. Once a residency is completed, the doctor is granted a certificate of specialty training. Many specialty programs have optional or required advanced degrees such as a master's degree, such as the Master of Science (MS or MSc), Master of Dental Surgery/Science (MDS/MDSc), Master of Dentistry (MDent), Master of Clinical Dentistry (MClinDent), Master of Philosophy (MPhil), Master of Medical Science (MMS or (MMSc); doctorate such as Doctor of Clinical Dentistry (DClinDent), Doctor of Medical Science/Sciences (DMSc), or PhD;or medical degree: Doctor of Medicine/Bachelor of Medicine, Bachelor of Surgery (MD/MBBS) specific to maxillofacial surgery and sometimes oral medicine).

== Official specialties ==
- Anesthesiology – The specialty of dentistry that deals with the advanced use of general anesthesia, sedation and pain management to facilitate dental procedures.
- Dental public health – The study of dental epidemiology and social health policies.
- Endodontics – Root canal therapy and study of diseases of the dental pulp.
- Oral and maxillofacial pathology – The study, diagnosis, and sometimes the treatment of oral and maxillofacial related diseases.
- Oral and maxillofacial radiology – The study and radiologic interpretation of oral and maxillofacial diseases.
- Oral and maxillofacial surgery – Extractions, implants, and facial surgery.
- Oral Medicine – the specialty of dentistry concerned with the oral health care of medically complex patients – including the diagnosis and management of medical conditions that affect the oral and maxillofacial region
- Orofacial Pain – The specialty of dentistry that encompasses the diagnosis, management and treatment of pain disorders of the jaw, mouth, face and associated regions.
- Orthodontics and dentofacial orthopedics – The straightening of teeth and modification of midface and mandibular growth.
- Periodontics (also periodontology) – Study and treatment of diseases of the periodontium (non-surgical and surgical) as well as placement and maintenance of dental implants
- Pediatric dentistry (formerly pedodontics) – Dentistry limited to child patients
- Prosthodontics – Dentures, bridges and the restoration of implants. Some prosthodontists further their training in "oral and maxillofacial prosthodontics", which is the discipline concerned with the replacement of missing facial structures, such as ears, eyes, noses, etc.

Specialists in these fields are designated "registrable" (in the United States, "board eligible") and warrant exclusive titles such as dentist anesthesiologist, orthodontist, oral and maxillofacial surgeon, endodontist, pediatric dentist, periodontist, or prosthodontist upon satisfying certain local (U.S., "Board Certified"), (Australia and New Zealand: Fellow of the Royal Australasian College of Dental Surgeons, designated by the post-nominal "FRACDS"), or (Canada: Fellow of the Royal College of Dentists, designated by the postnominal "FRCD(C)") registry requirements.

The American Board of Dental Sleep Medicine (ABDSM) provides board-certification examinations annually for qualified dentists. These dentists collaborate with sleep physicians at accredited sleep centers and can provide oral appliance therapy and upper airway surgery to treat sleep-related breathing disorders. While Diplomate status granted by the ABDSM is not one of the recognized dental specialties, it is recognized by the American Academy of Sleep Medicine (AASM). (See sleep dentistry in the section of sleep medicine about the US.)

A few other post-graduate formal advanced education programs: GPR, GDR, MTP residencies (advanced clinical and didactic training with intense hospital experience) and AEGD, SEGD, and GradDipClinDent programs (advanced training in clinical dentistry) are recognized but do not lead to specialization. There are CODA (Council on Dental Accreditation) programs in Orofacial Pain at more than ten Dental Schools in the USA.

Other dental education exists where no postgraduate formal university training is required: cosmetic dentistry, dental implant, temporo-mandibular joint therapy. These usually require the attendance of one or more continuing education courses that typically last for one to several days. There are restrictions on allowing these dentists to call themselves specialists in these fields. The specialist titles are registrable titles and controlled by the local dental licensing bodies.

== Other specialties or studies ==
- Special needs dentistry – Dentistry for those with developmental and acquired disabilities. It is a recognized specialty by the Royal Australasian College of Dental Surgeons. It has also been recently recognised as a specialty by the General Dental Council in the United Kingdom. The American Board Special Care Dentistry is hoping to also obtain accreditation for special needs dentistry by CODA.,
- Oral Biology - Research in Dental and Craniofacial Biology. This is often a PhD program and it is rare for dentists to pursue this degree.
- Forensic odontology – The gathering and use of dental evidence in law. This may be performed by any dentist with experience or training in this field. The function of the forensic dentist is primarily documentation and verification of identity.
- Geriatric dentistry or Geriodontics – The delivery of dental care to older adults involving the diagnosis, prevention, and treatment of problems associated with normal aging and age-related diseases as part of an interdisciplinary team with other health care professionals.
- Sports Dentistry is a branch of Advanced Dentistry. It deals with prevention, treatment and management of dental health of individuals related to Sports and Exercise. It also includes emergency management of sports injuries specifically related to the teeth and other oral tissues. Sports dentistry is the branch of sports medicine dealing with prevention and treatment of dental injuries and oral diseases associated with sports and exercise. It is usually pursued as a post graduation specialisation after BDS/DDS or equivalent. The various degrees of study of sports dentistry may include: Certificate course in sports dentistry (CSD/ C.S.D.), Diploma in Sports dentistry (DSD/ D.S.D.), Fellowship in Sports Dentistry (FSD / (F.S.D.) And Masters in Sports dentistry (M.Sc Sports dentistry). The sports dentist works as an individual consultant or as a member of the Sports Medicine Team.
- Veterinary dentistry, a speciality of veterinary medicine – The field of dentistry applied to the care of animals.
- Dental therapy is a field that emerged in the early 21st century, with practitioners who are not licensed dental doctors but who have the ability to perform basic exams, cleanings, and some basic surgeries like pulling teeth and filling cavities.
