= Hemisection =

Hemisection may refer to:

- Tooth hemisection
- Damage to half of the spinal cord, leading to Brown-Séquard syndrome
