= Postgraduate training in general dentistry =

Postgraduate training in general dentistry refers to programs that provide additional clinical experience for dental school graduates who intend to practice as general dentists. Such programs, typically one or two years in length, aim to broaden and refine skills across multiple areas of dentistry under supervision, sometimes in hospital settings and with medically complex patients. Such programs exist in a number of English-speaking countries.

== Australia ==
There are two forms of institution-based training for general dentistry available for dental school graduates in Australia:

- General dental residency or Dental house officer, often abbreviated as GDR and DO respectively.
- Graduate diploma in clinical dentistry, often abbreviated as GradDipClinDent

== Canada ==
There are three forms of institution-based training for general dentistry available for dental school graduates in Canada:

- General practice residency, often abbreviated as GPR
- Special Enhancement for general dentistry, often abbreviated as SEGD
- Multidisciplinary training program, often abbreviated as MTP

== United Kingdom ==
In the UK, most postgraduate training in dentistry are specialized. Some universities offer postgraduate degrees in general dentistry, with an emphasis on clinical research.

== United States ==
There are two forms of institution-based training for general dentistry available for dental school graduates in the United States:

- General practice residency, often abbreviated as GPR
- Advanced education in general dentistry, often abbreviated as AEGD

== Program details ==
All of the programs below can be 1-year programs with an option available to continue for a second year, or they may be a two-year program from the start. They allow the new dentist to further hone his or her skills in most of the traditionally defined disciplines of dentistry while at the same time increasing one's speed and refining one's techniques. These programs also afford trainees the opportunity to learn from the attending dentists who serve a supervisory role, something generally unavailable in private practice.

=== AEGD ===
While a GPR is a hospital-based program, an AEGD is usually not and the differences between the two types of programs are generally a result of this distinction. AEGDs are usually based in postgraduate dental school clinics. Both types of programs afford the trainee with a larger patient pool than he or she was exposed to in dental school as an undergraduate; while dental students will typically treat 2 or 3 patients a day in multiple-hour-long sessions, these postgraduate programs are constructed so that trainees may see anywhere from 8-15 patients a day, or even more. They emphasize restorative dentistry, fixed and removable prosthodontics, orofacial pain, and dental implants.

=== DO/GDR ===
Both DO and GDR programs are 1-year long commitments and are usually based in a hospital setting. These programs provide a dentist with a wide range of experiences including oral surgery, oral pathology, oral medicine, and treating medically compromised patients.

=== GPR ===
Programs will often emphasize the importance of managing comprehensive dental treatment plans and adjusting them based on the patient's medical condition. During training, residents may be faced with the task of managing patients that require dentistry in a hospital setting due to a compromised medical condition. Medical management of dental patients may be emphasized in weekly grand rounds and rotations through anesthesia, internal medicine, and the hospital emergency department. Some programs also provide rotations in family medicine and otolaryngology. These rotations not only increase the trainee's knowledge and experience, but also allow physicians, resident or attending, to see how dentistry and medicine are related, permitting a better referral relationship in future practices. This relationship is best demonstrated in tumor boards where both medical and dental residents discuss and treatment plan head and neck cancer patients. GPR residents may also become familiar with performing dental/oral surgical procedures in the operating room and managing the patient's stay while in the hospital. Rotation through the dental specialties increases the resident's ability to handle situations in private practice without referral to a specialist.

=== GradDipClinDent ===
These programs are usually 1-year in length and are designed very similar in structure to an AEGD program. Emphasis is placed on restorative dentistry, fixed prosthodontics, removable prosthodontics, orofacial pain, and dental implants.

=== SEGD ===
Emphasis is on enhanced general practice skills to allow for broader patient care to underserviced areas. Clinical experience is usually obtained from the residency clinic in the department of dentistry, and during rotations including off site rural experience.

=== Multidisciplinary training program ===
The goal of the program is to provide the recent dental graduate with a broad multidisciplinary approach to the clinical practice of dentistry. The postgraduate trainees are thus under the constant supervision and guidance of members of the attending staff. Experience is gained in general practice and specialties. The specialties represented are: Endodontics, Oral and Maxillofacial Surgery, Oral Medicine, Orthodontics, Periodontics, Prosthodontics and Pediatric Dentistry.

In general, GPR, DO/GDR, and MPT programs pay higher stipends than do AEGD, SEGD, and GradDipClinDent programs; this is because the former residents take call and answer consults. While on call, the residents are expected to manage dental as well as some head and neck trauma reporting to the ER in accordance with hospital guidelines

== Program examples ==
- Dental Procedure Education System
- GPR program at NJDS
- GPR program at MCG School of Dentistry
- MTP program at McGill
- AEGD program at Columbia CDM
