= American Board of Endodontology =

The American Board of Endodontics is the US certifying body for the specialty of endodontics, It was founded in 1956, and is sponsored by the American Association of Endodontists. The board is one of the nine dental specialty boards recognized by the American Dental Association.
