= Enamel-dentine fracture =

Complete fracture of the tooth enamel and dentine without the exposure of the pulp

Enamel-dentine fracture is a complete fracture of the tooth enamel and dentine without the exposure of the pulp. Pulp sensibility testing is recommended to confirm pulpal health. Treatment depends on how close the fracture is in relation to the pulp. If a tooth fragment is available, it can be bonded to the tooth. Otherwise, provisional treatment can be done, which the exposed dentine can be covered using glass ionomer cement or a more permanent treatment restoration using dental composite resin or other accepted restorative dental materials. If the exposed dentine is within 0.5mm of the pulp, clinically a pink appearance can be seen. This shows close proximity to the pulp. In this case, calcium hydroxide is used to place at the base and then covered with a material such as ionomer.

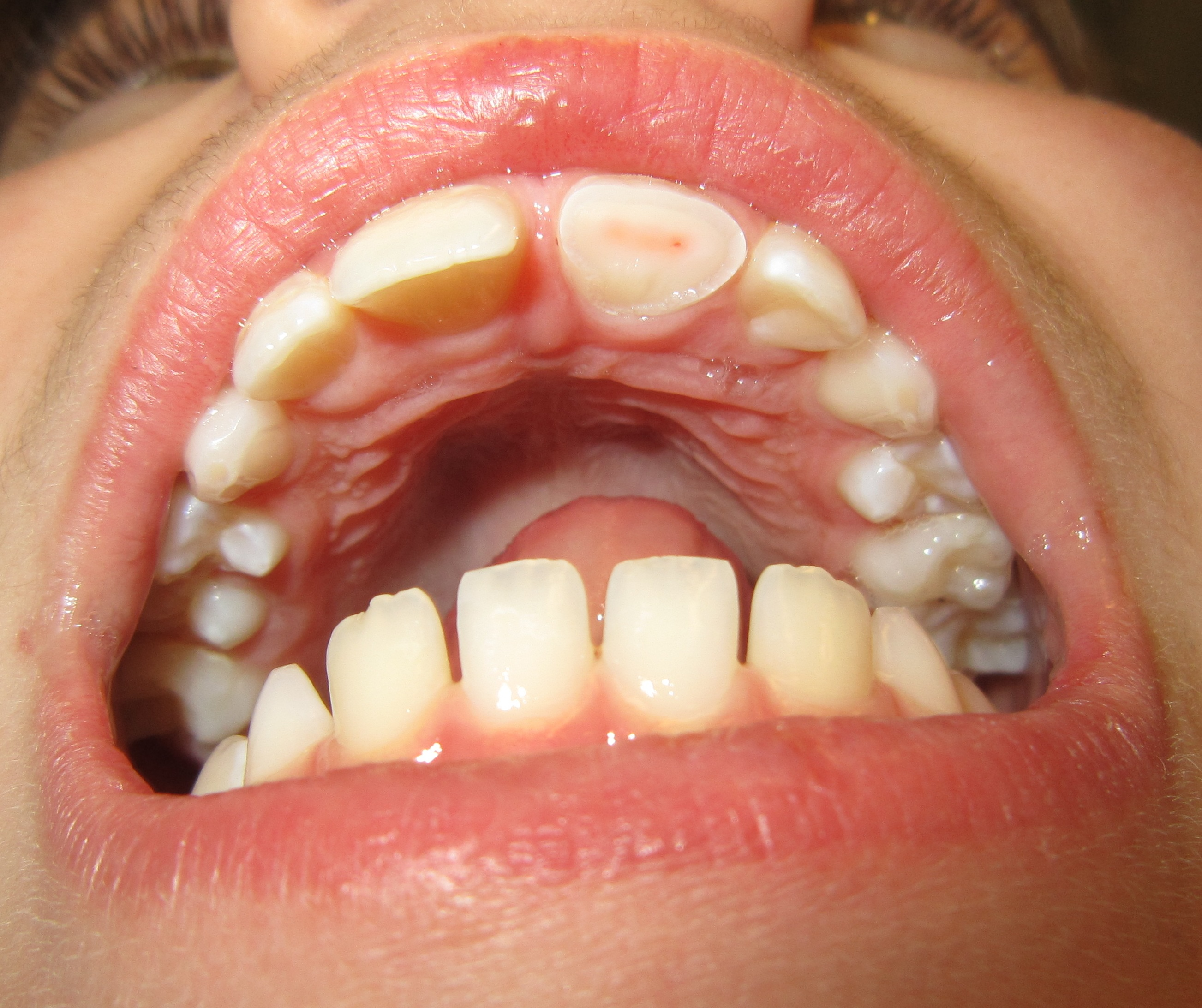
Fractured tooth

Enamel-dentin fractures are classified broadly under uncomplicated crown fractures. They are represented by visible loss of enamel and dentin without exposing the dental pulp (Patnana & Kanchan, 2021). The core clinical features include feeling of sensitivity and pain in the fractured tooth. Management of these fractures includes restoration of the fractured tooth or root canal treatment in fractured teeth with periapical lesions (The Recommended Guidelines of the American Association of Endodontists for the Treatment of Traumatic Dental Injuries, 2013).

== Etiology ==
Traumatic accidents cause injuries to teeth and oral structures, with a direct or indirect impact.

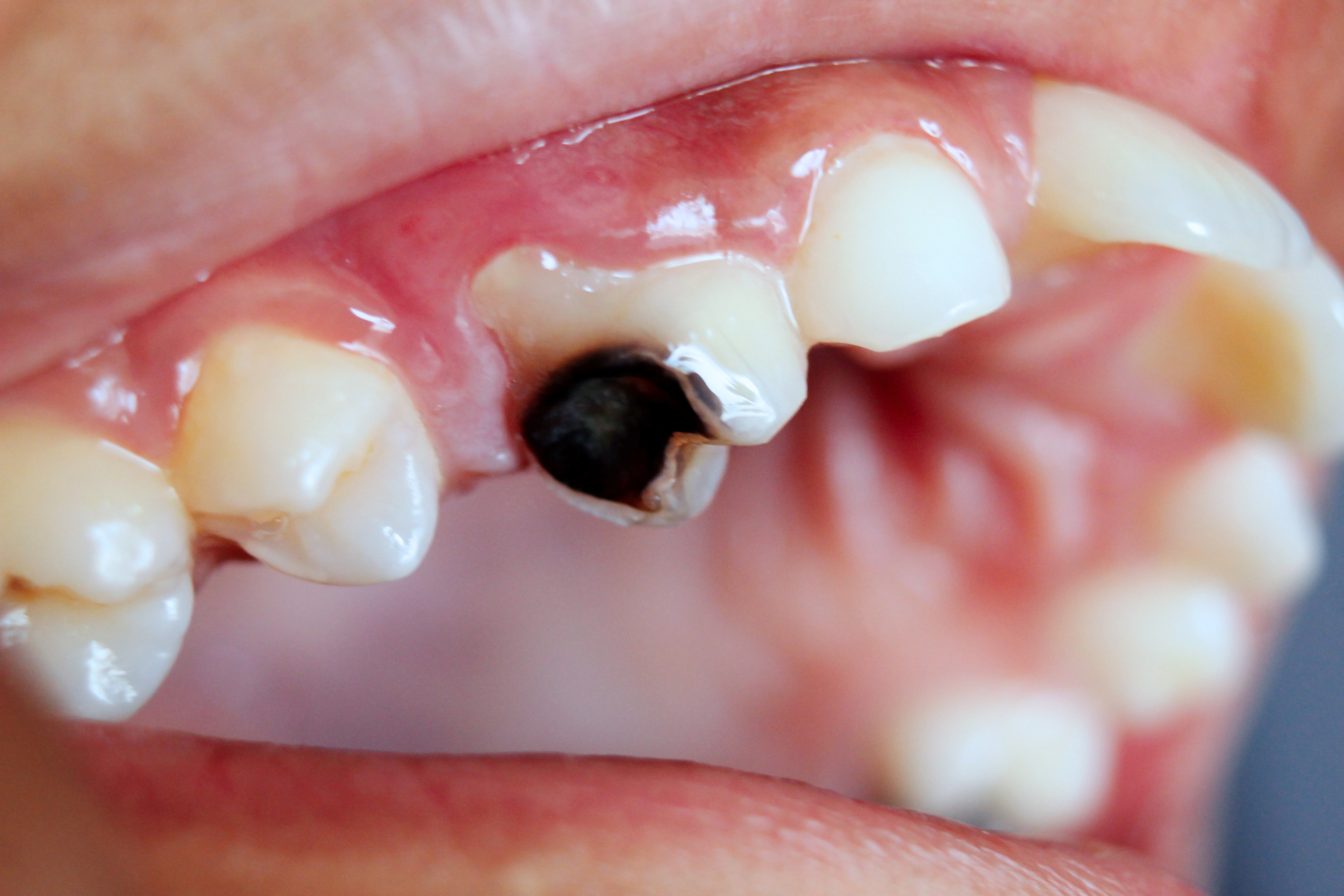
Dental carious lesion

- Falls, which account for 65% of cases (Saber Azami-Aghdash et al., 2015), are the most common etiology for traumatic dental injuries, especially in primary dentition. Trauma to the dentition can occur as a result of sports injuries, cycling accidents, motor vehicle accidents, and physical violence (Peng, 2023).
- Dental carious lesions are a predisposing cause of tooth fractures (Lubisich et al., 2010) due to the already weakened and undermined dental hard tissues.
- Patients with increased overjet or lip incompetence are also at a higher risk of suffering traumatic injuries in the upper incisors (Schatz et al., 2020).
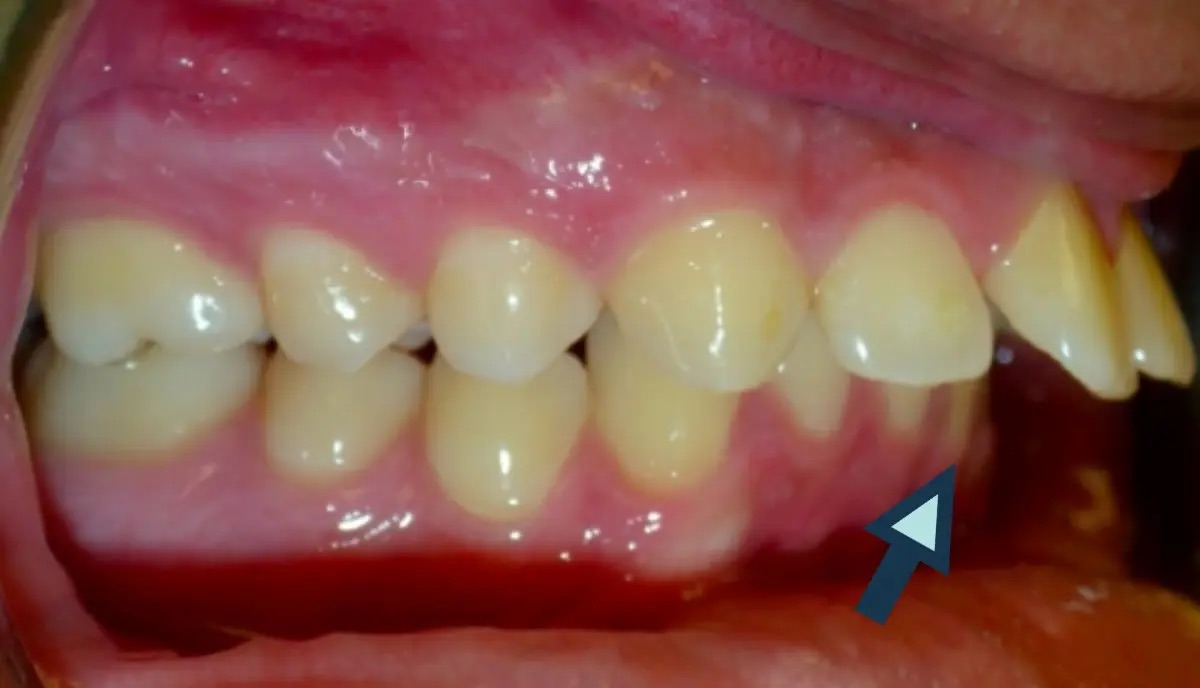
  Overjet

== Epidemiology ==
Oral traumatic injuries contribute to 5% of body injuries in all age groups. However, they are more frequent in children and also males than females. The most frequently fractured teeth are the maxillary central and lateral incisors due to their anatomic location in the oral cavity (Patnana & Kanchan, 2021). While single tooth fractures are more commonly occurring than multiple teeth fractures. (Deepa Lakshmi et al., 2020)

== Classifications/ Types ==
The common classification for tooth fracture is the Ellis and Davey Classification of tooth fracture (1960). It differentiates tooth fractures based on the extent of damage to tooth surfaces involved. This classification system is used to determine the severity of tooth fractures and to decide the treatment plan accordingly. (Diangelis & Bakland, 1998) Class I – Simple fracture of crown involving only enamel with little or no dentine involvement.

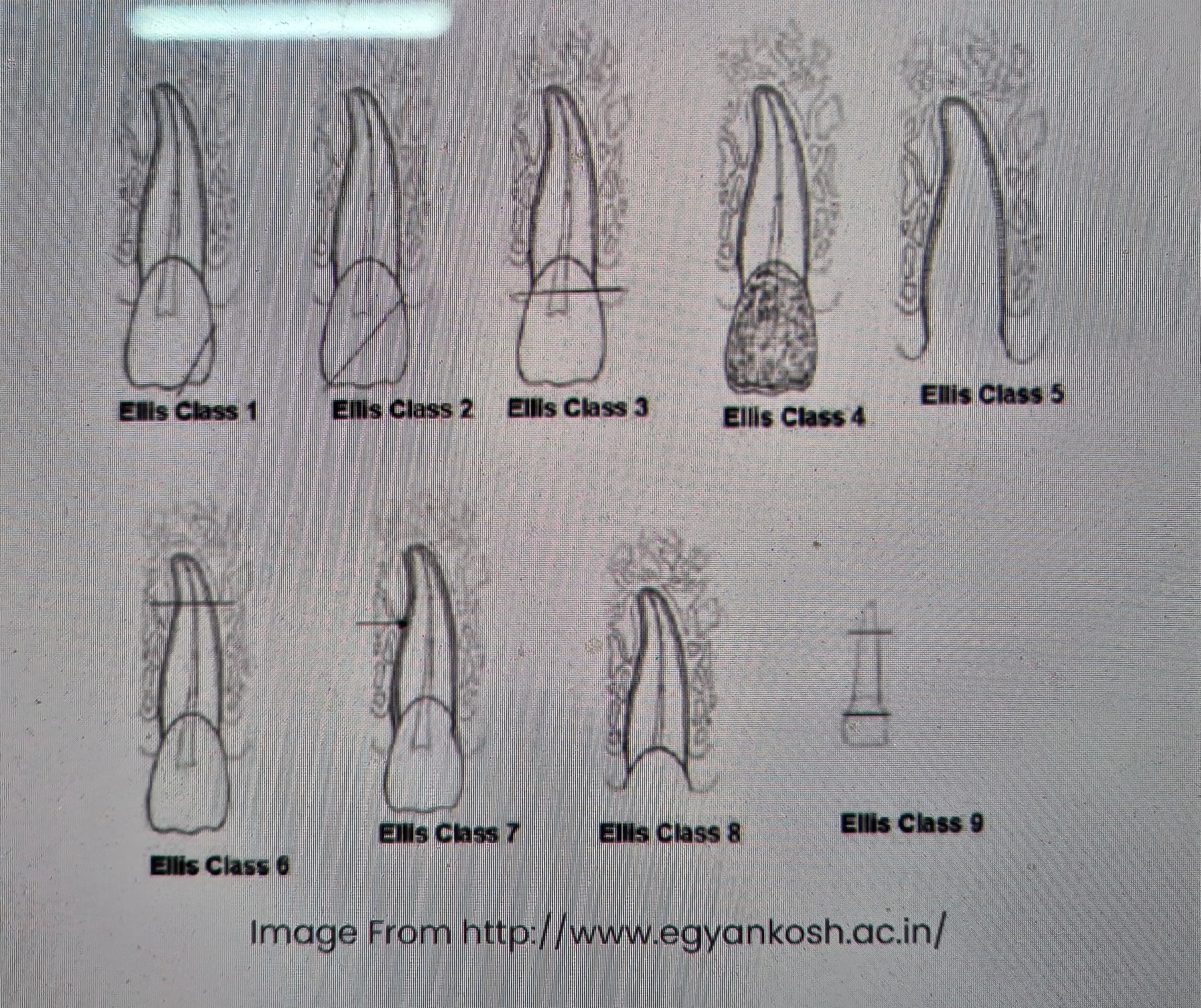

Class II – Extensive fracture of crown involving considerable dentin but not exposing the dental pulp.

Class III – Extensive fracture of crown involving considerable dentin and exposing the dental pulp.

Class IV – The traumatized tooth that becomes nonvital with or without loss of crown structure.

Class V – Total tooth loss—avulsion.

Class VI – Fracture of the root with or without loss of crown structure.

Class VII – Displacement of a tooth with neither crown nor root fracture.

Class VIII – Fracture of crown en masse and its displacement.

== Clinical features ==
| Types of fracture | Clinical findings | Radiographic findings |
|---|---|---|
| Enamel fracture | Complete fracture of the enamel; Loss of enamel with no visible signs of exposed dentin; Not tender; If tenderness is observed, evaluate the tooth for a possible luxation or root fracture injury; Normal mobility; Sensibility pulp test is usually positive | Enamel loss is visible; Radiographs recommended: periapical and occlusal exposures (to rule out the possible presence of a root fracture or a luxation injury); Radiograph of lip or cheek to search for tooth fragments or foreign materials |
| Enamel-dentin fracture | A fracture is confined to enamel and dentin with loss of tooth structure, but exposing the pulp; Not tender upon percussion test; If tenderness is observed, evaluate the tooth for possible luxation or root fracture injury; Normal mobility; Sensibility pulp test is usually positive | Enamel-dentin loss is visible; Radiographs recommended: periapical, occlusal exposures (to rule out tooth displacement or possible presence of root fracture); Radiograph of lip or cheek lacerations to search for tooth fragments of foreign materials |

== Clinical presentation ==
1. Tooth pain during biting or chewing: This discomfort may result from inflammation in the gum and surrounding tissues. The crack can expose the pulp to external stimuli leading to heightened tooth sensitivity and pain during these actions. (José F. Lázaro, 2021)
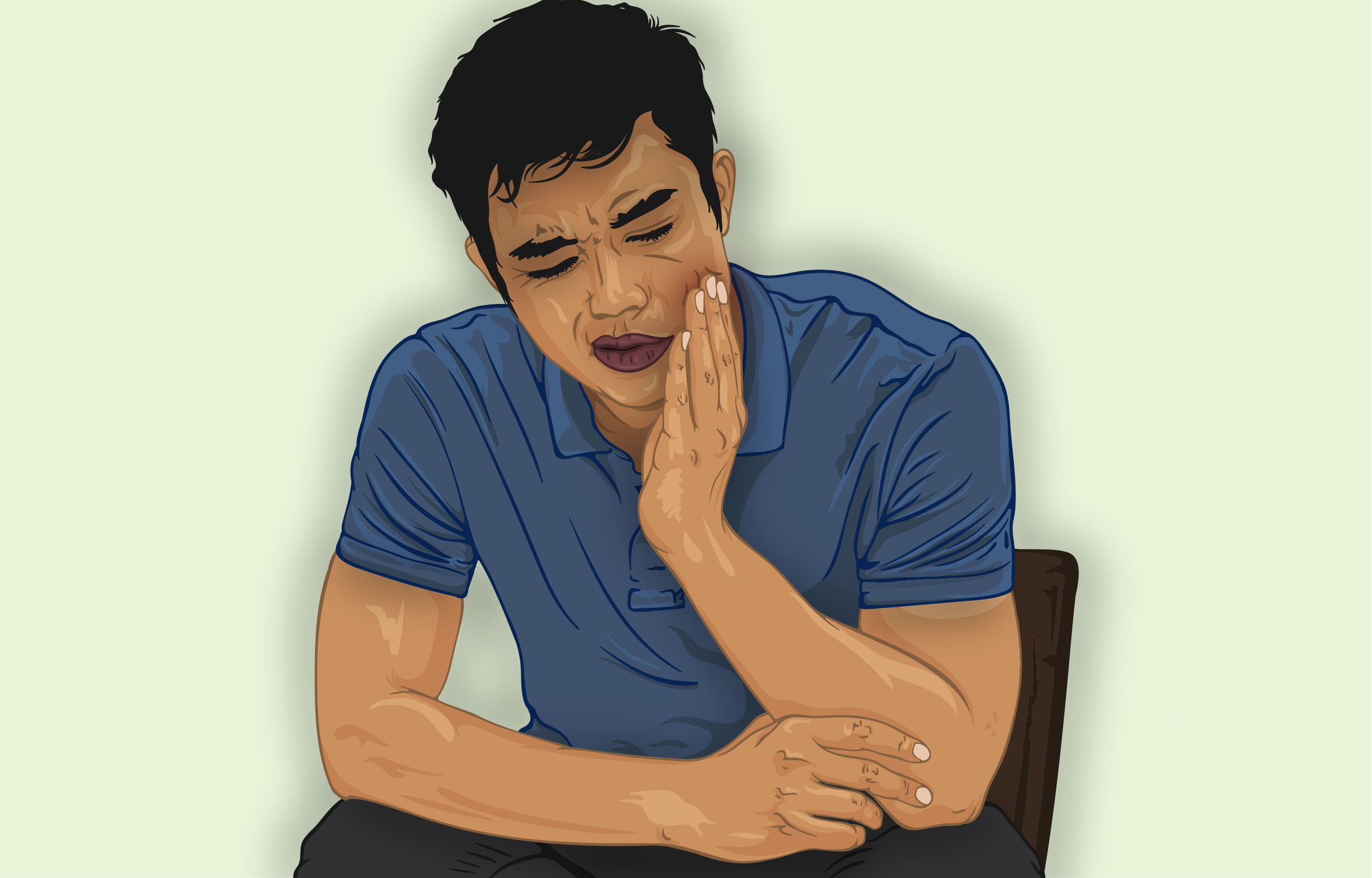
  Toothache
2. Increased sensitivity: A cracked tooth can cause heightened sensitivity to temperature and certain foods.
3. Infections: if a cracked tooth is left untreated, the pulp can become infected. This can result in severe pain and swelling around the affected area. Over time, the infection may spread beyond the tooth to the jawbone and nearby soft tissues, potentially leading to more severe complications. (José F. Lázaro, 2021)
4. Lack of visible symptoms: Unlike cavities, which can often be identified through visible signs like dark spots or enamel erosion, cracked teeth may not display obvious external indicators. (José F. Lázaro, 2021)

== Differential Diagnosis ==
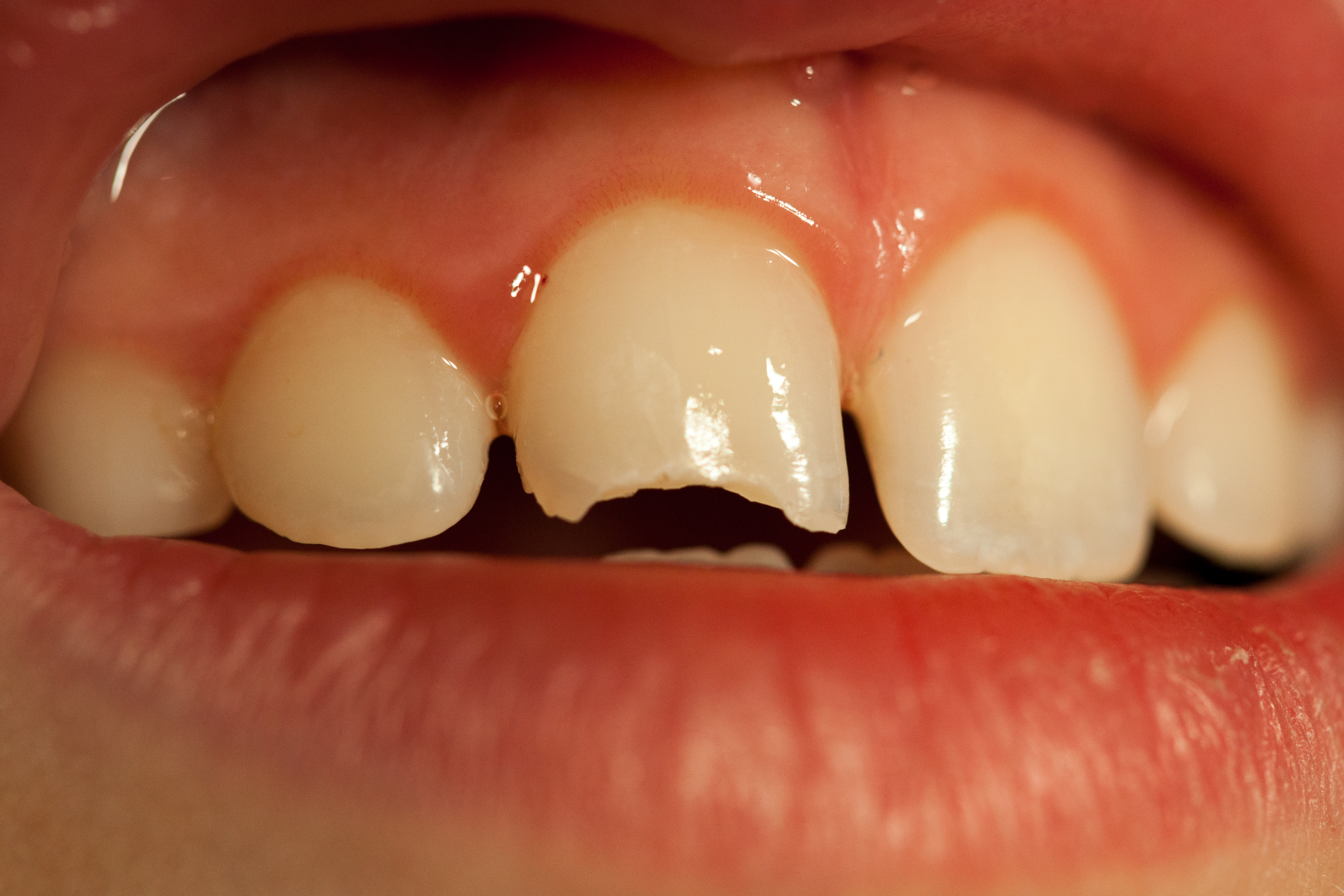
1. Enamel Fractures
  Enamel fractures (uncomplicated crown fracture) are limited to the enamel without exposing dentin or pulp. This type of fracture is usually located at a proximal angle or the incisal edge of the anterior region. (Olsburgh S, Jacoby T, Krejci I, 2002) Pulp sensibility tests and tooth mobility are usually normal. The radiographic examination will show the extension of the enamel loss. (Patnana & Kanchan, 2023)
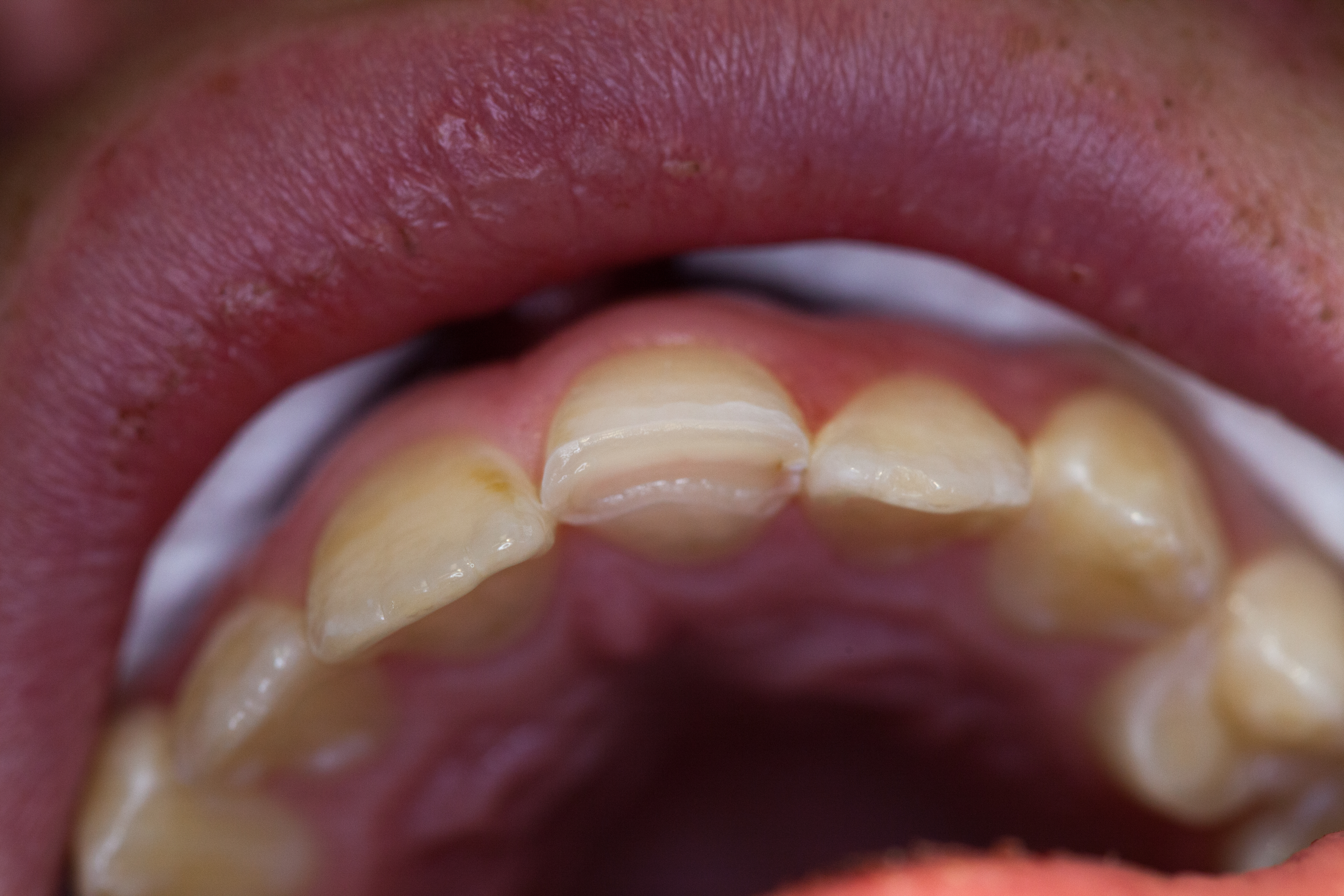
2. Enamel-dentin Fractures
  Enamel-dentin fractures (uncomplicated crown fracture) exhibit visible loss of enamel and dentin without exposing the dental pulp. When performing a clinical examination, the dentist will usually find a vital tooth with no sensitivity to percussion and no mobility. (Tooth Fracture, Enamel Only/Dentin Exposure, 2024)

== Diagnostic evaluation ==
The clinical diagnosis of enamel and dentin fracture typically involves integrating the patient's medical history with findings from clinical and auxiliary examinations.

1.Bite Test

Patients may report severe pain when biting on a cotton roll, swab or tooth slooth with the affected tooth. A hallmark of a fractured tooth is the sharp pain experienced upon the release of occlusal pressure. The nature of occlusal pain (location, direction, and intensity) depends on the crack's depth and orientation (Yu et al., 2022).

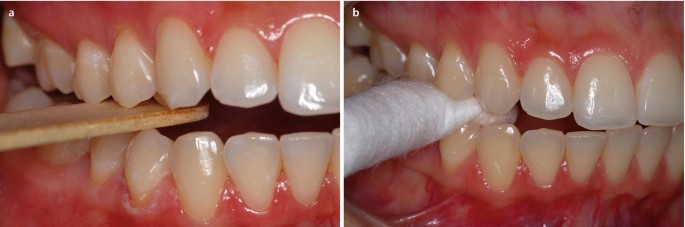
Bite Test

2. Vitality Test

Sensitivity to temperature stimuli, particularly cold, often indicates the presence of proximal or near-pulp cracks. A positive response to both cold stimulation and bite tests is suggestive of a cracked tooth (Mathew S et al.,2012)

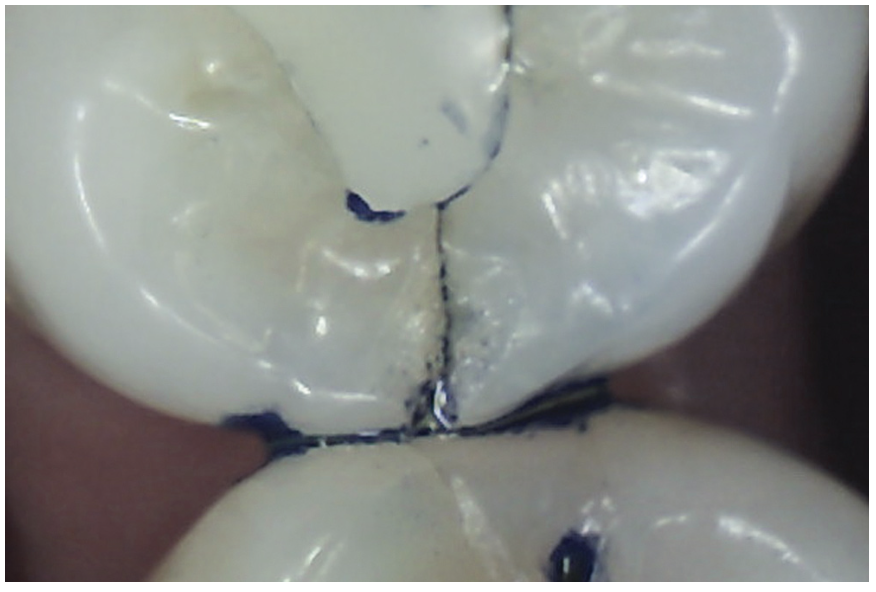
Dye Test

3. Dye Test

Dye application, using agents such as methylene blue can enhance the visibility of cracks (Yu et al., 2022). The dye test is limited in that it can only locate cracks but not assess their progression. Additionally, bacterial infiltration of cracks can cause discoloration that is difficult to remove, affecting aesthetics and treatment outcomes.

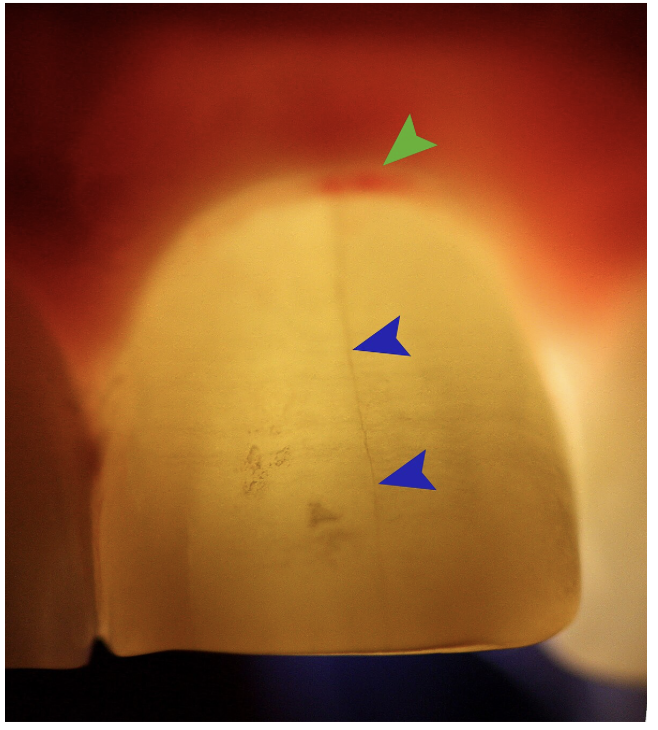
Enamel Fracture

4. Transillumination

Transillumination involves using fiber-optic light to illuminate the tooth surface, with light diffraction at the crack helping to locate it (Chanchala HP et al., 2022).

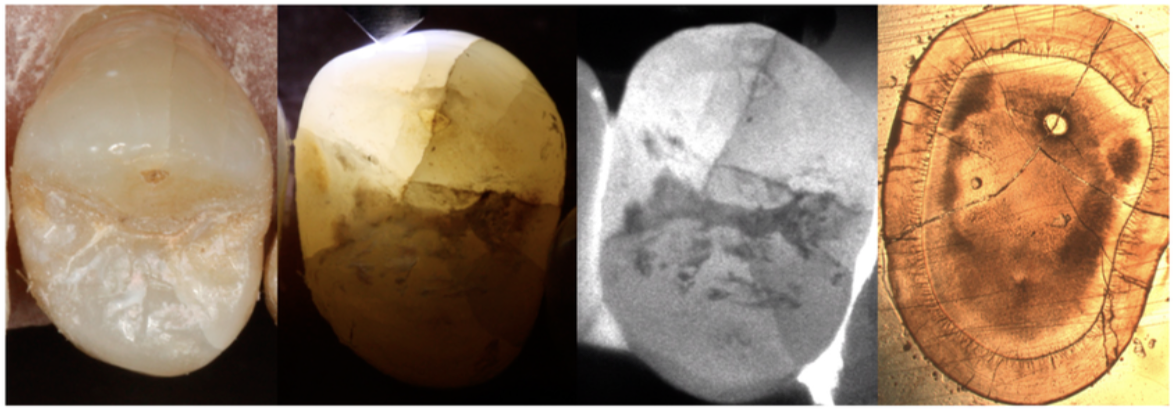
Microscopic Detection

5. Microscope detection

Cracks with width less than 18 μm are difficult to detect with the naked eye, making dental microscopes an essential tool for crack identification.

6. Periodontal Probing

Narrow, deep periodontal pockets at a suspicious tooth site may indicate a subgingival crack. The depth of the pocket can indirectly reflect the crack's subgingival extension. Studies indicate that teeth with probing depths greater than 4 mm due to cracks are more prone to pulp necrosis (Bajaj et al., 2016).

7. Radiographic examination

a. Periapical Radiographs

These provide detailed 2D images of the tooth and can detect fractures extending into dentin but may miss subtle enamel-only cracks due to their limited resolution.

b. CBCT

CBCT offers 3D imaging with high spatial accuracy, ideal for locating and assessing fractures extending into dentin or adjacent structures.

c. Micro CT

MicroCT has a high detection accuracy, capable of identifying cracks with widths ranging from a few tenths to tens of microns. It is widely regarded as the gold standard for detecting cracks in research on cracked teeth.

== Treatments and Management ==
1. Apply MTA Liner (if complicated crown fracture)

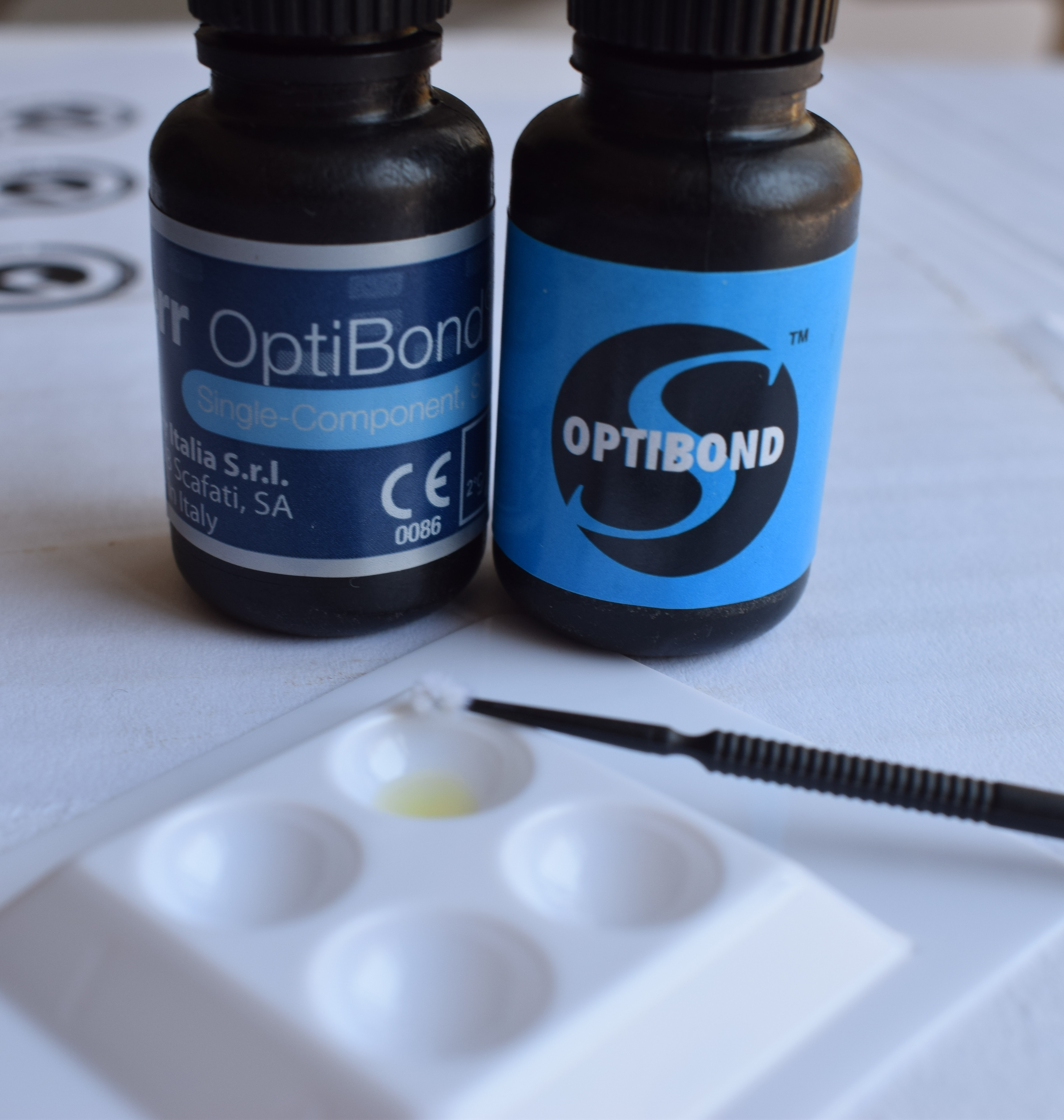
Dental bonding agents

If the fracture is close to the pulp, the dentist may apply a layer of MTA to protect the area and encourage healing

2. Preparation for Restoration

An acid etchant is applied to clean the exposed dentin and improve the bonding process. A bonding agent is then used to form a secure base for the restoration material.

3. Repairing the Tooth

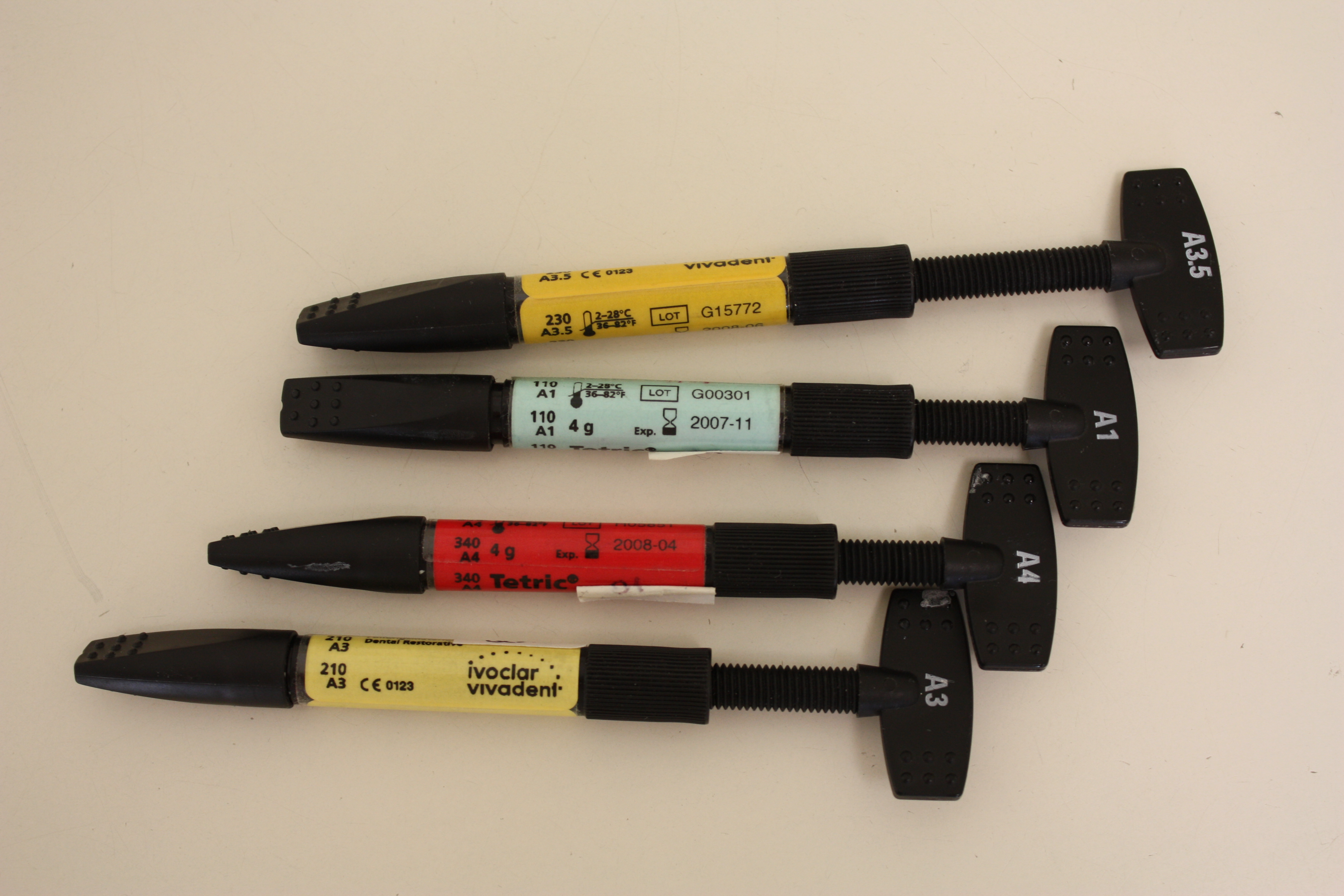
Composite resin

A tooth-colored material such as composite resin or glass ionomer is applied to rebuild and protect the tooth.

4. Final Polishing and Shaping

Shape and polish the restoration material to match the natural contours of the tooth, ensuring smoothness and a natural appearance.

Tooth fractures if left untreated, can lead to complications like pulp necrosis (death of the tooth's pulp), root resorption, or periapical abscesses (infection around the tooth's root) under rare circumstances. (Bourguignon et al., 2020) To avoid these issues, regular follow-up appointments are essential.

== Complications ==
1. Pulpal Complications: a) Pulpitis: This is inflammation of the pulp tissue due to irritation from bacterial infiltration, trauma, or exposure to oral fluids through the dentin tubules. b) Pulp Necrosis: The pulp tissue dies as a result of untreated pulpitis or direct trauma.
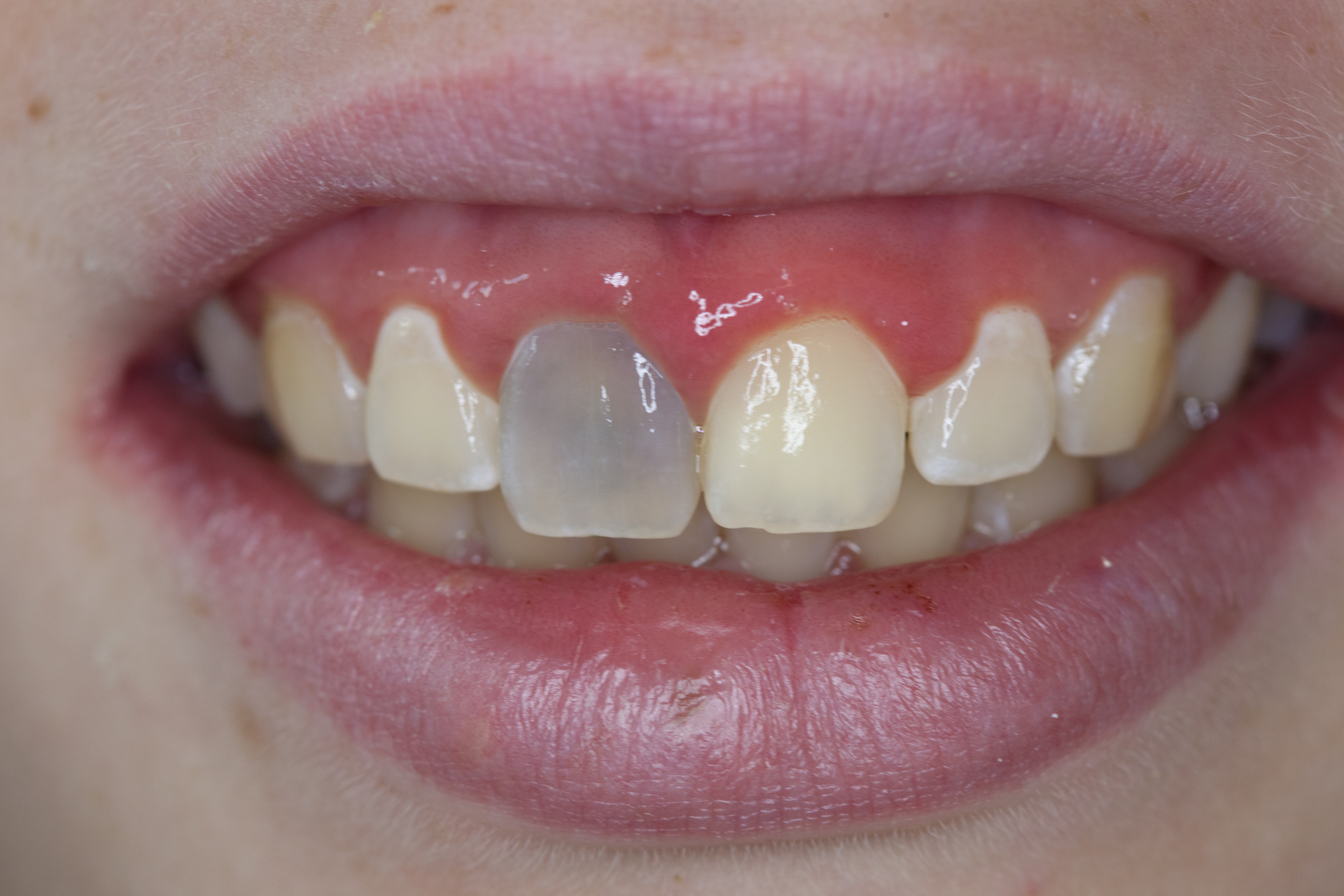
  Tooth discoloration
2. Infection: If bacteria penetrate the dentin and reach the pulp, it can lead to abscess formation or other periapical (around the root tip) infections. This can result in swelling, pain, and possible tooth loss if left untreated. (Yu CY, Abbott PV, 2016)
3. Discoloration: A tooth that has undergone trauma may gradually change color. This is often due to internal bleeding or necrosis of the pulp tissue, resulting in a grey, yellow, or dark hue. (Yu CY, Abbott PV, 2016)
4. Secondary Caries: Exposed dentin is more prone to bacterial colonization, leading to the risk of developing caries at the fracture site, especially if oral hygiene is compromised. (Yu CY, Abbott PV, 2016)
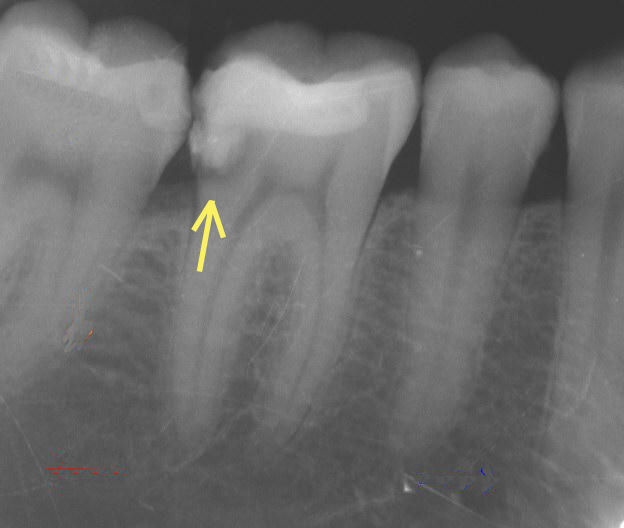
  Secondary caries
5. Hypersensitivity: Dentin exposure can cause ongoing sensitivity to temperature changes, sweet or acidic foods, and even air. This occurs because the dentinal tubules are exposed, transmitting stimuli directly to the pulp. (Yu CY, Abbott PV, 2016)
6. Loss of Tooth Structure: If not treated, the fracture may worsen over time, leading to further breakdown of the enamel and dentin, potentially resulting in the need for more extensive restorative treatments like crowns or extractions. (Yu CY, Abbott PV, 2016)
