= Root fracture =

Root fracture of the tooth is a dentine cementum fracture involving the pulp.

Traumatic root fracture occurs most often in the middle third of the roots of fully erupted and fully formed teeth. However, root treated teeth are more susceptible to root fracture, as this involves removing root dentine, thereby weakening the tooth.

Objectives of the treatment is to reposition the coronal fragments to allow revascularisation of the tooth, therefore maintaining aesthetics and functional integrity.

== Vertical root fracture ==
Vertical Root Fractures are longitudinally orientated fractures of the root. They extend from the root canal to the periodontium. They are usually seen in root filled teeth, however they can also be seen in non-restored teeth.

The fractures can involve the whole length of the root or only a section of it. When un-recognised they lead to frustration and inappropriate endodontic therapy. The time between a root filling and a fracture is around 39 months, but they can occur during the treatment.

Diagnosis is tricky as there as signs and symptoms are frequently delayed and no single clinical feature indicates a root fracture is present.

=== Signs and symptoms ===
They often present with discomfort/soreness which may be associated with an infection. Pain is usually mild to moderate in its intensity. Patients may also report a pain on biting.

Another characteristic feature is the repetitive and frequent dislodgement of an apparently well-fitting post.

=== Predisposing factors ===
- Root Canal Anatomy: Roots narrower in mesio-distal dimension are more susceptible to fracture.
- Dentin Characteristics: Dentine of pulpless teeth is stiffer and more susceptible to fracture
- Corrosion: Corrosion of pins and posts can contribute
- Use of a spreader: The wedging effect of the spreader during lateral condensation can lead to it.

=== Treatment ===
A clinician should remember that whilst a root fracture remains, bone around the tooth is continuing to be lost, compromising the success of any future potential implants.

Anterior teeth with a vertical root fracture have a very poor prognosis and treatment is mainly extraction.

Multi-rooted teeth can be successfully treated by removing the fractured root, either by root amputation or hemisection.

== Horizontal root fracture ==
Horizontal root fracture is when the fracture line is perpendicular or oblique to the long axis of the tooth. It can occur in the apical, middle or coronal portion of the root.

Horizontal root fracture accounts for only 3% of all dental injuries.

=== Detection ===
Horizontal root fractures can often be identified by taking a peri-apical radiograph.

Now, with the introduction of cone beam computed tomography (CBCT), it is possible to view root fractures three-dimensionally.

=== Treatment ===
The treatment of horizontally root-fractured teeth involves re-positioning, stabilisation and occlusion adjustment, with a good chance of survival.

The exception to this is when the horizontal fracture affects the coronal third of the root, in which case extraction is necessary in 80% of cases.

In this case of pulpal necrosis, which occurs in 20-44% of root fracture cases, this can be treated through root canal treatment or endodontic surgery.

When the coronal fragment of the tooth is stable, then splinting is unnecessary.

However, in the case that the fracture affects the coronal third of the root, is in close-proximity to the cemento-enamel junction, and it is almost impossible to prevent the contents of the oral cavity contacting the fracture, then splinting for at least 2 months is required.
