= Dental Procedure Education System =

The Dental Procedure Education System (DPES), is a web-based resource containing a collection of procedures from the dental disciplines. The procedures presented in DPES were developed by individual faculty members at the Faculty of Dentistry, University of Toronto, in collaboration with a group of educational media and technology experts. Consequently, DPES reflects the philosophy that guides the teaching methods and the clinical practice of these procedures at the Faculty of Dentistry.

== Purpose ==
DPES was designed and built to serve primarily the instructional needs of the students at the Faculty of Dentistry, University of Toronto. However, due to the public ramifications of the act of providing dental health care, a public extension to DPES was also developed. DPES has multiple purposes, which can be summarized as follows:

- It allows the students to visualize procedures through an easily accessible web-based interface;
- It provides a link between the didactical and clinical segments of the students' education at the Faculty;
- It acts as a constant resource of pertinent and academically relevant information on dental procedures, thus enhancing the quality of learning at the Faculty;
- It may be used by students before a treatment session to review procedural steps that need to be performed on a patient;
- It facilitates the students' development of their communication skills, in order for them to establish a better rapport with their patients;
- It provides patients with advance information about the procedure(s) for which they are scheduled. Thus, it facilitates the process of obtaining informed consent from patients for the procedure(s) they are about to undergo;
- It serves as a public repository of information for general purpose dental care education.

== Structure ==
Given the purposes outlined above, DPES is divided in two distinct parts:

- A patient version (DPES), open to the public, and;
- A student version (DPES Pro), restricted only to the students, faculty and staff of the Faculty of Dentistry, University of Toronto.

The following two sections of this article describe in more detail the features of and differences between the two versions of DPES.

=== DPES ===
The public version, going by the same title as the parent program (DPES) is provided by the Faculty of Dentistry as an open source of information and dental care education. It is targeted in equal measure to the Faculty's patients and to the rest of the public. As such, DPES uses simple language to explain the steps involved in the performance of a specific dental procedure.

Layout of a DPES procedure

Patients are provided with a visual presentation of the procedure, which employs a combination of 3D animations, actual video footage and still images to illustrate those steps. In addition, a written article describing the procedure is placed under the visual presentation. Where applicable, the article details some of the concepts presented visually or provides the patient with further relevant information, such as post-operative care or follow-up visits.

Because the patients can be instructed by their dentists to view the procedures in advance, the patients may gain a better understanding of the various aspects involved in a particular procedure. Thus, DPES may contribute to reducing the patients' pre-operative anxiety levels and to expediting the informed consent process.

Finally, depending on the procedure involved, a patient may review online the dentist's post-operative recommendations included in the visual presentation or in the written article.

=== DPES Professional ===
DPES Pro main page

DPES Professional, or DPES Pro, is intended primarily for the education of the Faculty of Dentistry's students in the undergraduate Doctor of Dental Surgery program (DDS) and it is not open to the public. As is the case with the patient version, DPES Pro uses the same combination of high-end visuals to demonstrate the techniques and methods of conducting a procedure. However, the language used in DPES Pro differs from the patient version in that the terminology is geared toward dental practitioners. The visual demonstration is normally longer than that in the patient version and, thus, it is divided into chapters for easy access to specific parts of the presentation.

The written article that accompanies the visual presentation provides an extended scholarly explanation of the procedure, by including sections such as preliminary background or historical information about the procedure, recent research findings and their clinical implications, competing views about procedural techniques or methods, contentious or controversial issues regarding the procedure, etc. True to academic form, the article contains a list of references used in the body of the text. Thus, the student has access to the most recent literature that the author of the article considers relevant for a specific procedure.

== Production ==
DPES procedures follow a well-defined production cycle before they are published. The first step involves the drafting of an article for the procedure in DPES Pro by a faculty member or several faculty members of the Faculty of Dentistry. In normal circumstances, the same faculty member(s) will also be the one(s) teaching the procedure. The article is posted internally to the online repository. Once the article is drafted, it is submitted to two other faculty members for review.

Upon the completion of the review process, the author extracts the procedural section of the article and writes two separate scripts that will serve as the narrations for the visual parts of the procedures in DPES Pro and DPES, respectively. The visual presentation for DPES Pro is then assembled by the media team according to the script and with the input of the author. As soon as the visual elements are created and assembled, the author performs a final review of the visual presentation. Once the visual presentation is approved by the author, it is placed at the top of the written article in DPES Pro.

The visual presentation for DPES (public version) is created from the visual material already developed for DPES Pro. However, the public version is generally shorter and its script uses plain terms to explain the procedure. In the case of DPES, the script may also serve as the written article for the procedure, but the author may choose to extend it, annotate it or to create an entirely new article to be placed under the visuals.

When the two versions of the procedures are completed and approved, they are published and released to their particular audiences.
