= Root resection =

Surgical removal of an entire tooth root

Root resection or root amputation is a type of periradicular surgery in which an entire root of a multiroot tooth is removed. It contrasts with an apicoectomy, where only the tip of the root is removed, and hemisection, where a root and its overlying portion of the crown are separated from the rest of the tooth, and optionally removed.

The procedure will first start with the doctor injecting the area with local anesthesia, after which an incision is created at the gum tissues around the affected root to allow your specialist to have access to the infected peri-apical tissues.

This procedure can help your dentist remove infected and damaged tissues in the root area. Also, to prevent the risks of infection, a small filing is inserted at the end of the root canal. Lastly, to close the gum tissues, sutures will be placed to completely close the incision. After it is completely healed for a week, the bone will be back to its normal function.

Patients who undergo root resection are given specific instructions for post-operative care, including: oral hygiene maintenance, taking prescribed medications as directed, scheduling follow-up appointments to monitor healing and assess treatment success.
