= Microsurgical endodontics =

Microsurgical endodontics is that aspect of endodontics which evolved after the introduction of the Surgical Operating Microscope (SOM) to endodontics in the early 1990s. The recent addition of SOM's to endodontic therapy can allow better visualization and management of the surgical field by endodontists during endodontic procedures (mostly root canal treatment) through magnification and greatly improved high intensity lighting. SOMs typically magnify in the 4X to 25X range. The other commonly used magnification aide, through lens eyeglass mounted surgical telescopes, provide 2.5X to 4.5X magnification. Surgical operating microscopes have a steep learning curve and require training, as well as patience and practice to master.

Some studies have demonstrated higher success rates in surgical procedures using SOMs when compared to direct vision. However, use of the surgical operating microscope routinely for endodontic procedures is not considered the standard of care in endodontics.
