= Tooth hemisection =

Hemisection of a molar tooth; the mesial root is removed by sectioning the tooth into half.

Tooth hemisection is a type of endodontic surgery in which a root and its overlying portion of the crown are separated from the rest of the tooth; the separated part may be optionally removed. It contrasts with root resection, where a root is removed while leaving the crown intact, and an apicoectomy, where only the tip of the root is removed.

A hemisection is only performed on molars, which have 2 to 3 roots. Incisors, canines, and lower premolars only have 1 root each. Hemisections are also usually performed on the lower molars rather than the upper molars. During a hemisection, a general dentist or periodontist cuts the molar in half. The root and crown on the affected side are removed.

The dentist will make a small incision in the gum tissue to expose the deeper structure of the tooth initially, then the roots will be separated. At the same time, decay and other parts of the tooth will be removed to protect the overall mouthpart. Following this, the area is cleaned with sterile saline solutions and if necessary, the small cuts will be stitched closed. The tooth is then covered with a temporary crown or filling, which is going to be replaced with a permanent fixture at a later date. Overall, a hemisection will take between 30 minutes and an hour to carry out, depending on the amount of decay and periodontal disease present. In many cases, an initial procedure will be needed prior to the hemisection.
