= American Association of Endodontists =

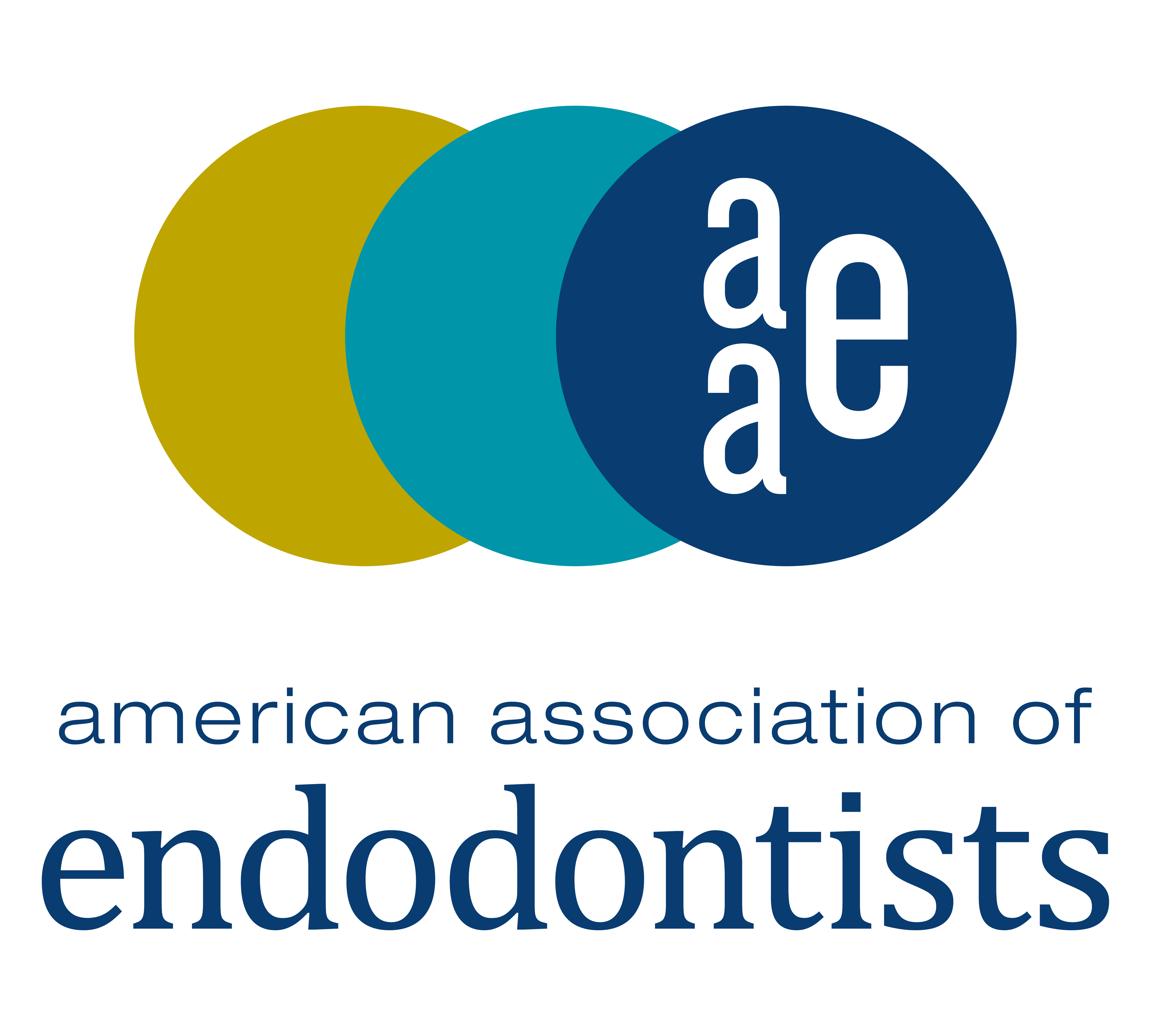
- Founded: 1943
- Type: Professional Association
- Location: Chicago, Illinois
- Members: 7,400+
- President: Dr. Alan S. Law
- Website: www.aae.org

The American Association of Endodontists, or AAE, is a non-profit organization of endodontists and other professionals with an interest in endodontics founded in 1943.

Headquartered in the Two Prudential Plaza Building in Chicago, Ill., the Association represents more than 7,400 members worldwide. Endodontics is one of 12 dental specialties formally recognized by the American Dental Association.

In 2004 Sandra Madison, of Asheville, North Carolina, was elected as the first female president of the American Association of Endodontists.

== Journal ==
The Journal of Endodontics is the official journal of the American Association of Endodontists and is published by Elsevier.

== Overview ==
The American Association of Endodontists serves as the primary source of continuing education in endodontics for its members, the dental profession, the public and others. As an educational and social medium, the AAE Annual Session attracts endodontists and other dental professionals from around the world to exchange ideas and learn the latest endodontic techniques and research. Smaller educational conferences are offered around the United States.

The Association sponsors the American Board of Endodontics, the national Board responsible for certifying endodontists. Board certification requires successful completion of the Written, Case History Portfolio and Oral Examinations. Endodontists who achieve Board certification are known as Diplomates of the ABE.

The Association also partners with the AAE Foundation, a charitable organization promoting the advancement of the science of endodontics through grants to education and to research. The Foundation awards research grants to students and researchers twice a year. It supports education through the Endodontic Educator Fellowship Award, a program that pays tuition and a stipend to students who agree to teach endodontics full-time for five years, and other funding initiatives.
