= Root canal =

Hollow part of the root of a tooth

Details

Identifiers
- Latin: canalis radicis dentis
- MeSH: D014092
- TA98: A05.1.03.049
- TA2: 932
- FMA: 55674

A root canal is the naturally occurring anatomic space within the root of a tooth. It consists of the pulp chamber (within the coronal part of the tooth), the main canal(s), and more intricate anatomical branches that may connect the root canals to each other or to the surface of the root.

== Structure ==
At the center of every tooth is a hollow area that houses soft tissues, such as the nerve, blood vessels, and connective tissue. This hollow area contains a relatively wide space in the coronal portion of the tooth called the pulp chamber. These canals run through the center of the roots, similar to the way graphite runs through a pencil. The pulp receives nutrition through the blood vessels, and sensory nerves carry signals back to the brain. In the case of irreversible damage to the pulp, root canal treatment can relieve associated dental pain.

Root canal anatomy consists of the pulp chamber and root canals. Both contain the dental pulp. The smaller branches, referred to as accessory canals, are most frequently found near the root end (apex), but may be encountered anywhere along the root length. The total number of root canals per tooth depends on the number of the tooth roots ranging from one to four, five or more in some cases. Sometimes there are more than one root canal per root. Some teeth have a more variable internal anatomy than others.

An unusual root canal shape, complex branching (especially the existence of horizontal branches), and multiple root canals are considered as the main causes of root canal treatment failures. (For example, if a secondary root canal goes unnoticed by the dentist and is not cleaned and sealed, it will remain infected, causing the root canal therapy to fail.)

=== Root canal system ===
The specific features and complexity of the internal anatomy of the teeth have been thoroughly studied. Using a replica technique on thousands of teeth, Walter Hess made clear as early as 1917 that the internal space of dental roots is often a complex system composed of a central area (root canals with round, oval or irregular cross-sectional shape) and lateral parts (fins, anastomoses and accessory canals). In fact, this lateral component may represent a relatively large volume, which challenges the cleaning phase of the instrumentation procedure in that tissue remnants of the vital or necrotic pulp as well as infectious elements are not easily removed in these areas. Thus, the image of root canals having a smooth, conical shape is generally too idealistic and underestimates the reach of root canal instrumentation.

=== Contents ===
Procedures for root canal

The space inside the root canals is filled with a highly vascularized, loose connective tissue, called dental pulp. The dental pulp is the tissue of which the dentin portion of the tooth is composed. The dental pulp helps complete formation of the secondary teeth (adult teeth) one to two years after eruption into the mouth. The dental pulp also nourishes and hydrates the tooth structure, making the tooth more resilient, less brittle and less prone to fracture from chewing hard foods. Additionally, the dental pulp provides a hot and cold sensory function.

=== Variation ===
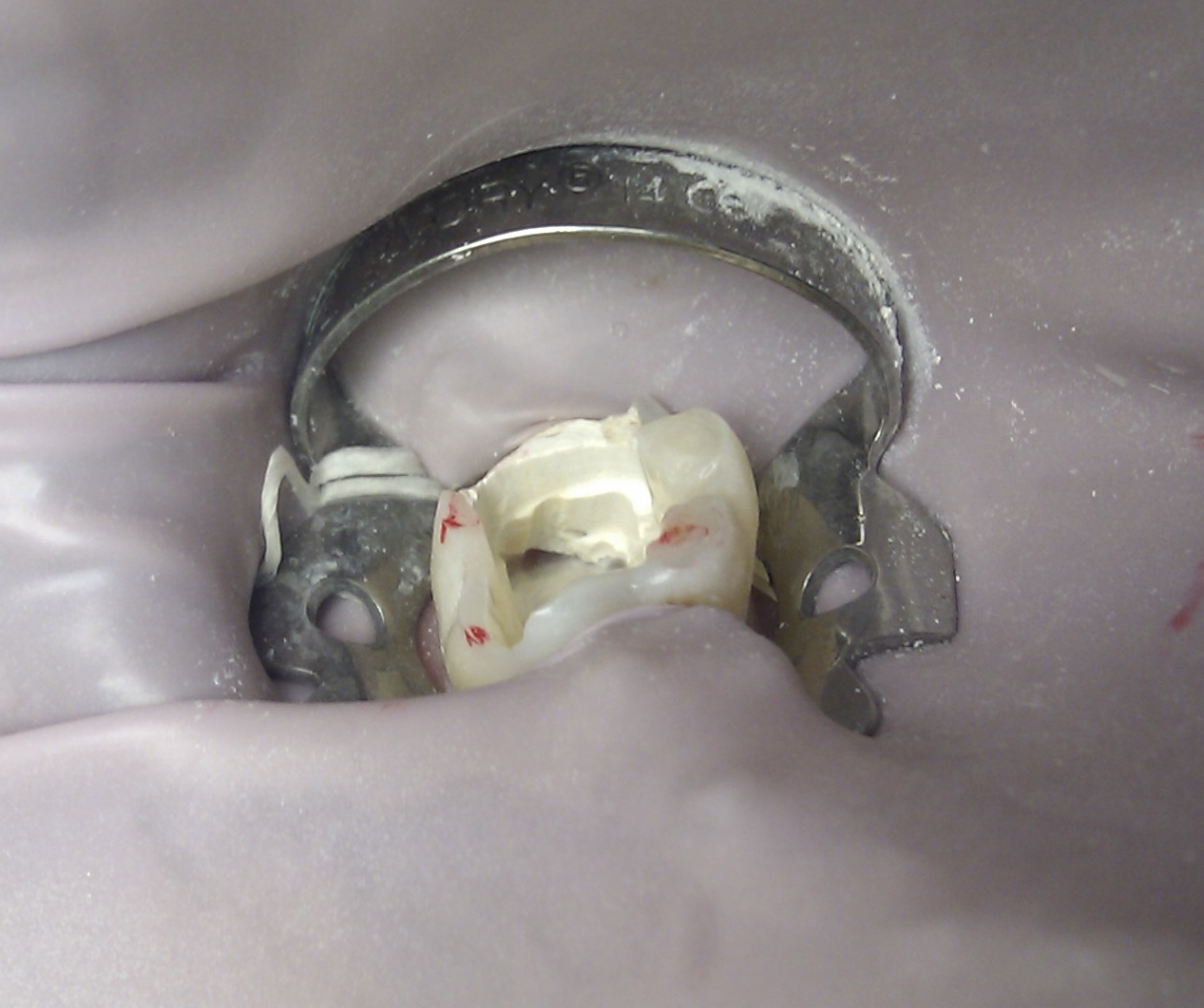
Root canal pulp removed, cleaned and made ready for filling and placing a crown

Root canals presenting an oval cross-section are found in 50–70% of root canals. In addition, canals with a "tear-shaped" cross section are common when a single root contains two canals (as occurs, for example, with the additional mesial root seen with the lower molars), subtleties that can be more difficult to appreciate on classical radiographs.

Recent studies have shown that use of cone-down CT scans can detect accessory canals that would have been missed in 23% of cases, which can in turn lead to apical periodontitis. The upper molars, in particular, are predisposed to have an occult accessory canal in nearly half of patients.

== Clinical significance ==
Root canal is also a colloquial term for a dental operation, endodontic therapy, wherein the pulp is cleaned out, the space disinfected and then filled.

When rotary nickel titanium (NiTi) files are used in canals with flat-oval or tear-shaped cross sections, a circular bore is created due to the rotational action of the metal. Also, small cavities within the canal such as the buccal or lingual recesses may not be instrumented within the tooth, potentially leaving residual disease during disinfection.

Tissue or biofilm remnants along such un-instrumented recesses may lead to failure due to both inadequate disinfection and the inability to properly obturate the root-canal space. Consequently, the biofilm should be removed with a disinfectant, commonly sodium hypochlorite, during root canal treatment.

== Restoration after root canal treatment ==
After root canal treatment, the tooth is usually restored with a crown or a filling to protect it and restore function. In restorative dentistry, root canal treatment is considered alongside fillings, crowns, bridges, Dentures, and implants. After restoration, such a tooth can continue to function like a normal tooth.

== See also ==
- Dental implants
- Oral and maxillofacial surgery
- Ralph Frederick Sommer
