= Enamel fracture =

Cracking the outermost layer of a tooth without exposing the inner layers

An enamel fracture is when the outermost layer of the tooth is cracked, without damaging the inner layers including the dentine or pulp. This can happen from trauma such as a fall where the teeth are impacted by a hard object causing a chip to occur.

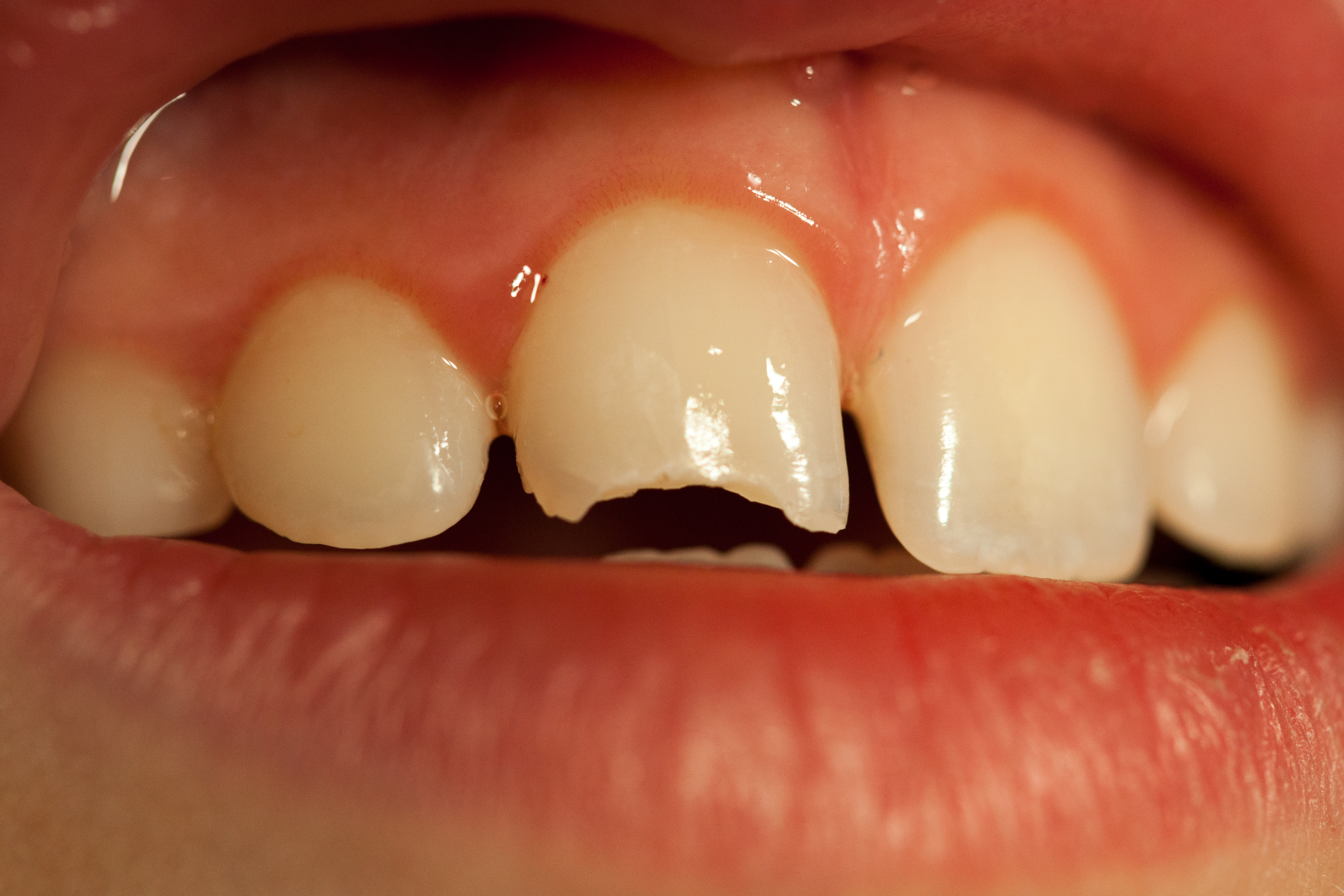
Enamel fracture of tooth 11 on the incisal, biting, surface

The term “craze lines” and "enamel infraction" are also used to describe minute incomplete cracks exclusive to the enamel surface.

== Introduction ==
An enamel fracture occurs when the outer layer of the tooth, known as enamel, is fractured without directly impacting the underlying tooth tissues of the dentine or pulp. This phenomenon typically arises from hard, external forces impacting the tooth to induce enamel breakage. These fractures are often characterised by irregular breaks on the biting surface of the tooth, in contrast to the smoother surfaces associated with typical tooth degradation. Enamel fractures can vary in severity, ranging from minor cosmetic issues to more significant structural problems. An enamel fracture typically doesn't cause any noticeable symptoms such as tenderness or an increase in mobility. However, if sensitivity and mobility are present, it may indicate an enamel-dentine fracture or a root fracture.

== Aetiology ==
Enamel fractures commonly result from direct impacts to the tooth, often occurring due to a variety of accidents. These accidents encompass a broad spectrum of situations, including sports-related injuries, cycling mishaps, motor vehicle collisions, and physical altercations. Notably, falls stand out as a major factor, responsible for the majority of dental enamel fractures. The severity of the damage inflicted on the tooth correlates directly with the energy, magnitude, shape, and direction of the impacting force.

Enamel fractures can also arise from malocclusion which is when the teeth do not align as properly as they should. This can result in excessive pressure on some areas of the teeth, particularly during chewing or grinding, which increases the risk of enamel fractures occurring.

== Classifications ==
Various terms and classifications are used to differentiate types of tooth fractures; however, a limited number applies exclusively to enamel fractures. This limitation arrives from the sole effect on the outer tooth layer in enamel fractures, independent from the underlying dentine or pulp.

According to the Ellis Classification System for Enamel Fractures, a fracture involving only the enamel is categorised as a Class I fracture. Class I fractures can be further described as either vertical or horizontal, and as complete or incomplete. Patients affected by such fractures do not typically experience pain in response to temperature, air, or tapping (percussion) on the fractured tooth.

The term “craze lines” is also used to describe minute cracks exclusive to the enamel surface.

== Diagnosis ==
Early detection plays a pivotal role in stopping fracture progression. Various diagnostic techniques are available to localise and assess the direction of the fracture, including clinical examinations, transillumination and bite tests. Moreover, recent advancements in diagnostic methods, such as optical coherence tomography (OCT) and near-infrared imaging, offer potential diagnostic tools for improved detection and evaluation.

=== 1. Clinical examination ===
Clinical examination with visual inspections can help dentists localise potential defects in the tooth. Magnifying loupes might be required for enhanced visualisation. Limitations include the limited accessibility to severity and depth of fracture planes. Old restorations and staining are advised to be removed for clearer visualisation. Additionally, the dentist may test for pain on percussion (by tapping the teeth with the end of the mirror to assess whether the tooth is painful) or palpation (of the gum to assess whether there is pain which may indicate an infection). The dentist may check is the tooth has a vital nerve supply, these tests may include sensibility testing, such as electrical pulp testing or thermal testing.

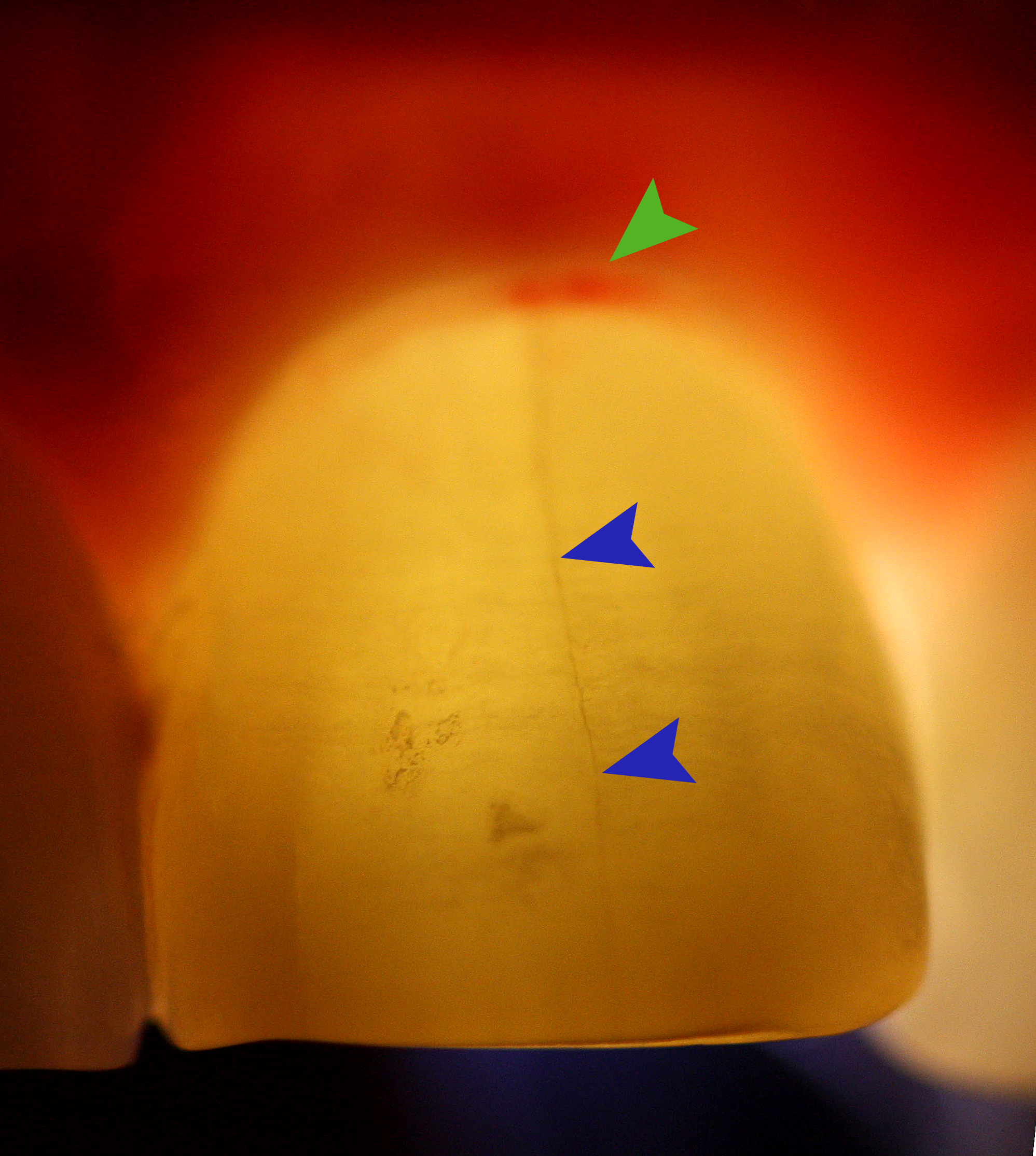
Transillumination of tooth 21 showing vertical fracture (blue arrows) and inflammation in marginal gingiva at fracture site (green arrow)

=== 2. Transillumination ===
Transillumination aids in locating the fracture plane by diffracting light from the LED light source. Transillumination will show the enamel fracture to appear darker compared to the rest of the tooth due to the light not passing through. Yellow and orange light are best to enhance diagnostic accuracy. It is advised to remove former restorations before assessment and diagnosis to properly assess the tooth.

=== 3. Radiographic assessment ===
When a tooth is fractured, small parts of the enamel is lost, the missing enamel should be accounted for, if the fragment cannot be found the patient's lip should be examined thoroughly to assess for the possibility it remains in the lip. This assessment can be achieved via radiographs.

Radiographs of the tooth are indicated to assess the extent of the fracture, one parallel periapical radiograph should be taken, this is a radiograph showing the whole tooth including the crown, root and bone.

== Recent Advances and potential diagnostic tools ==
The following technology is still being researched and is not available for general dental practice.

=== Optical coherence tomography ===
Optical coherence tomography (OCT) is a non-invasive and non-destructive imaging technology. It uses infrared light waves to provide high-resolution images of internal structures. Studies have suggested swept-source optical coherence tomography (SSOCT) as a potential diagnostic tool, given the high image-producing speed and the high sensitivity in detecting fractures and decay within the enamel layer.

== Treatment ==
In cases of a simple enamel fracture, the recommended approach is to reattach the broken tooth fragment, if it is possible. Following reattachment, smoothing of the edges is undertaken. Depending on the extent of the fractured portion, a choice is made between a glass ionomer or permanent restoration, such as composite resin, to ensure structural integrity and good aesthetics. If the enamel fracture is small, then the tooth edges can be smoothed without requiring a restoration.

If the enamel fracture is mild, there is no advisement for subsequent follow-up appointments. However, if the fracture is large the dentist may want to review the restoration and monitor the tooth for any potential complications, including pulp necrosis, which represents an extreme outcome of an enamel fracture characterized by the death of the tooth pulp. Early detection and intervention are pivotal in ensuring optimal outcomes and maintaining oral health following dental trauma.
