= W94 =

W94 may refer to:

- Barodontalgia
- Camp Peary, a United States military training ground
- Great icosidodecahedron
- SS W 94, an Empire ship
