= Dental trauma =

Injury to the teeth or surrounding tissues

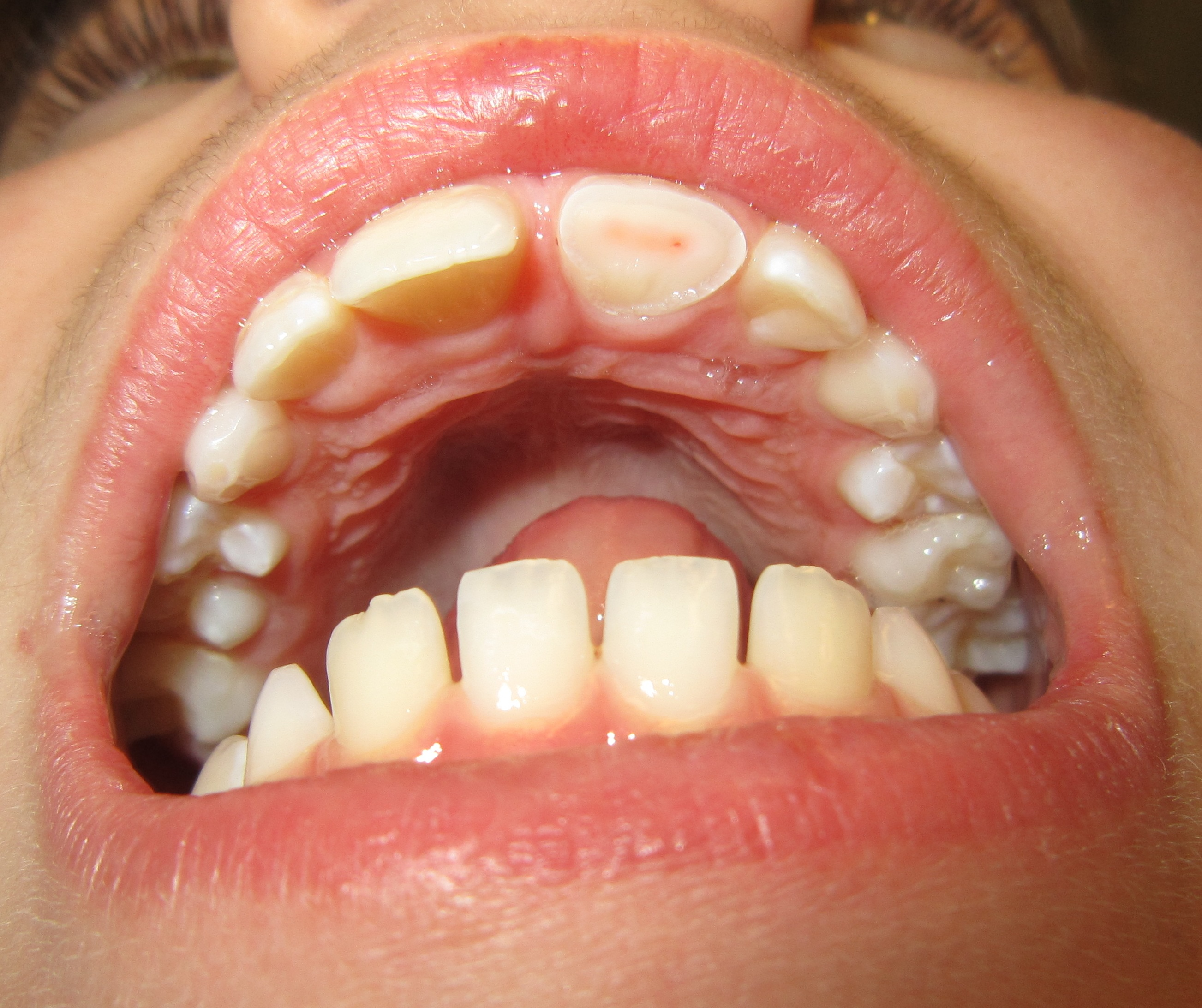
- A broken upper incisor. The layers of tissue that make up the tooth are clearly visible, with the pink pulp standing out against the paler dentine and tooth enamel.
- Specialty: Oral and maxillofacial surgery

Dental trauma refers to trauma (injury) to the teeth and/or periodontium (gums, periodontal ligament, alveolar bone), and nearby soft tissues such as the lips, tongue, etc. The study of dental trauma is called dental traumatology.

== Types ==
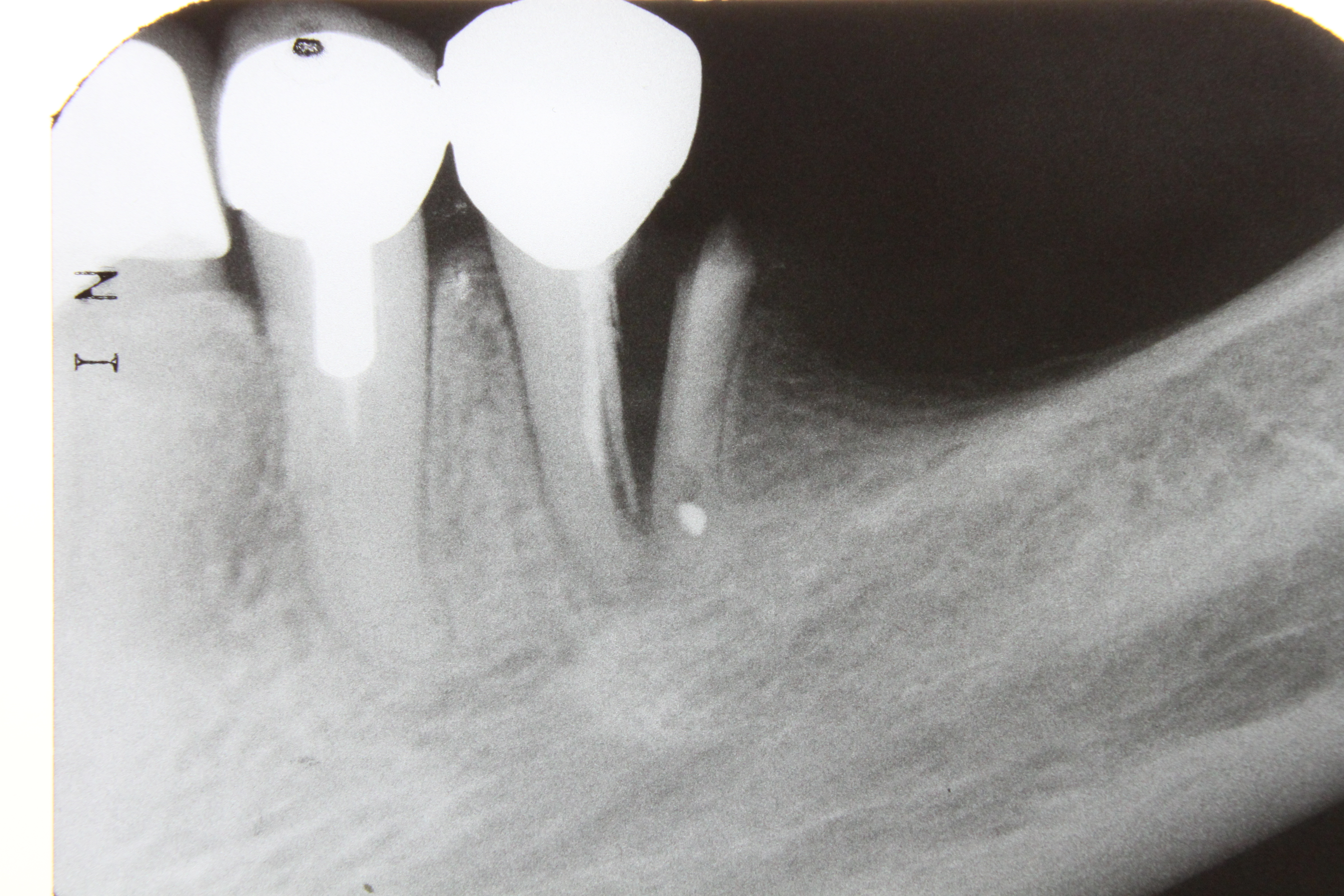
Root fracture

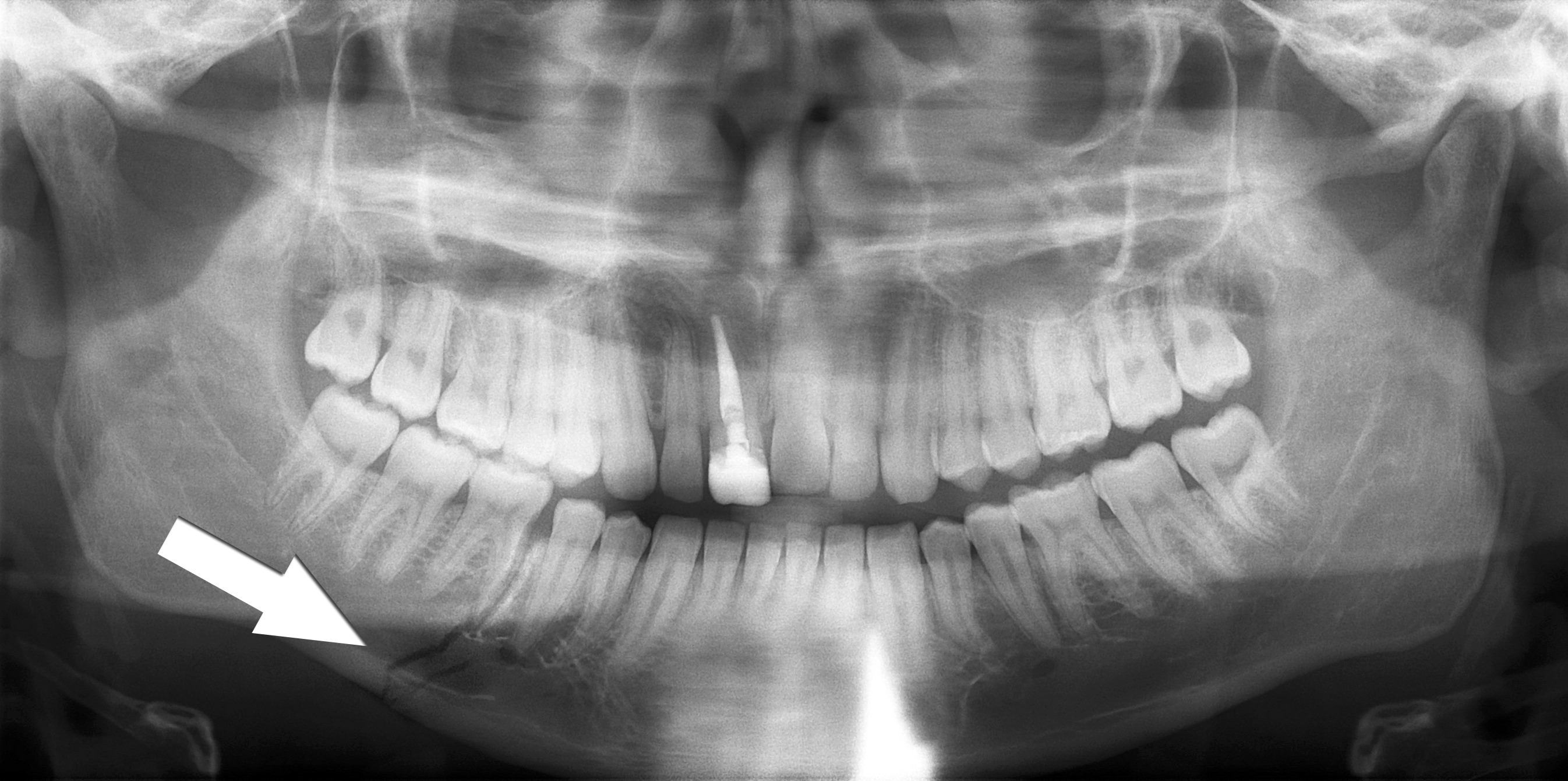
Simple mandible fracture

=== Dental injuries ===
Dental injuries include:

- Enamel infraction
- Enamel fracture
- Enamel-dentine fracture
- Enamel-dentine fracture involving pulp exposure
- Root fracture of tooth

=== Periodontal injuries ===
- Concussion (bruising)
- Subluxation of the tooth (tooth knocked loose)
- Luxation of the tooth (displaced)
  - Extrusive
  - Intrusive
  - Lateral
- Avulsion of the tooth (tooth knocked out)

=== Injuries to supporting bone ===
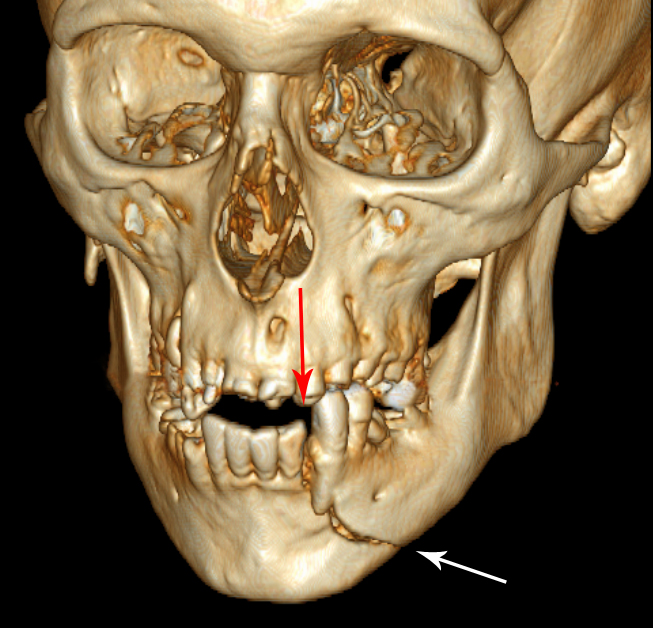
3D CT of mandible fracture.

This injury involves the alveolar bone and may extend beyond the alveolus. There are five different types of alveolar fractures:

- Communicated fracture of the socket wall
- Fracture of the socket wall
- Dentoalveolar fracture (segmental)
- Fracture of the maxilla: Le Fort fracture, zygomatic fracture, orbital blowout
- Fracture of the mandible

Trauma injuries involving the alveolus can be complicated as it does not happen in isolation, very often presents along with other types of tooth tissue injuries.

Signs of dentoalveolar fracture:

- Change to occlusion
- Multiple teeth moving together as a segment and are normally displaced
- Bruising of attached gingivae
- Gingivae across the fracture line often lacerated

Investigation: Require more than one radiographic view to identify the fracture line.

Treatment: Reposition displaced teeth under local anaesthetic and stabilise the mobile segment with a splint for 4 weeks, suture any soft tissue lacerations.

=== Soft tissue laceration ===
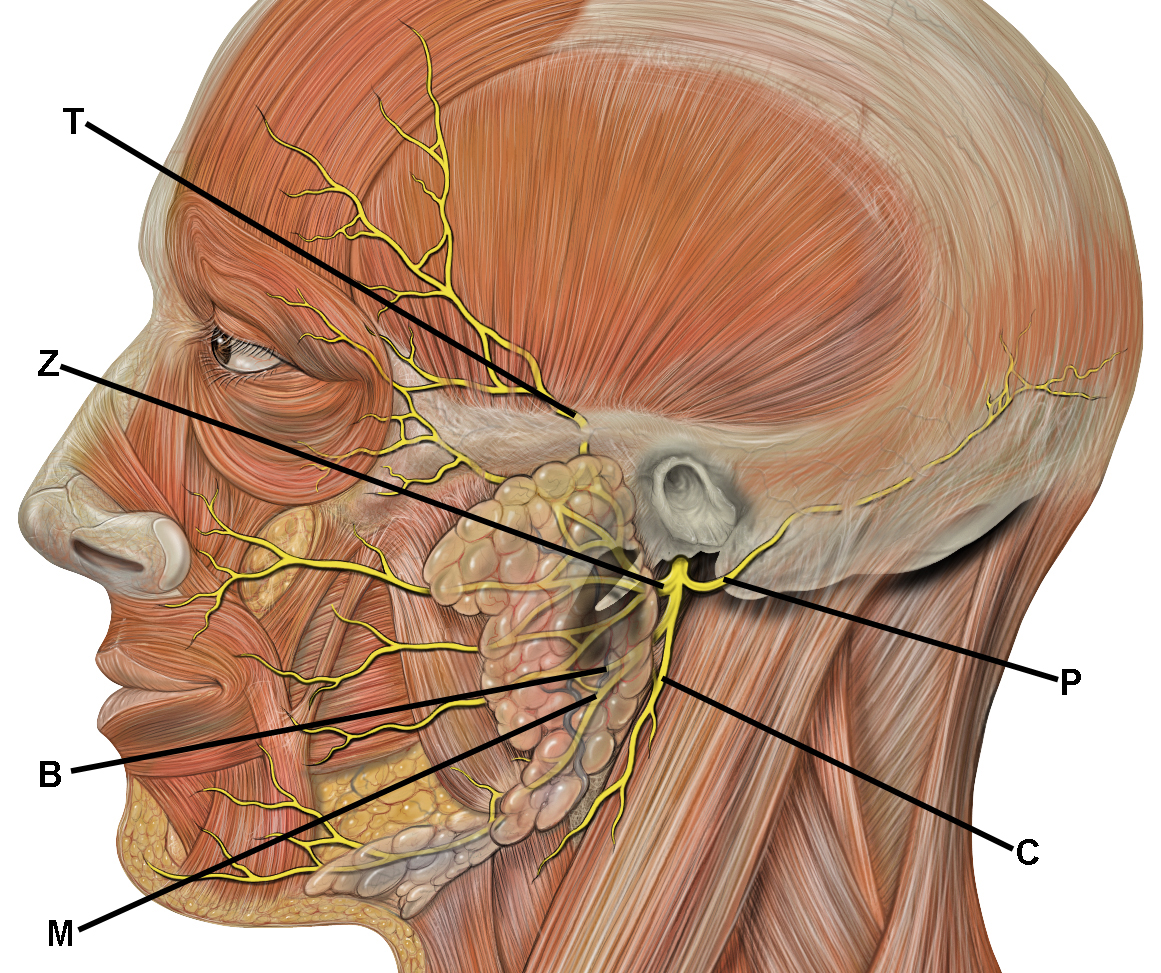
Facial nerve branches. Facial nerve should be examined for any potential damage when buccal mucosa is involved.

Soft tissues injuries are presented commonly in association with dental trauma. Areas normally affected are lips, buccal mucosa, gingivae, frenum and tongue. The most common injuries are lips and gingivae. For lips, important to rule out presence of foreign objects in wounds and lacerations through careful examination. A radiograph can be taken to identify any potential foreign objects.

Gingivae lacerations that are small normally heals spontaneously and do not require any intervention. However, this can be one of the clinical presentation of an alveolar fracture. Gingivae bleeding especially around the margins may suggest injury to the periodontal ligament of the tooth.

The facial nerve and parotid duct should be examined for any potential damage when the buccal mucosa is involved.

Deep tissue wounds should be repaired in layers with sutures that are resorbable.

=== Primary teeth ===
Trauma to primary teeth occurs most commonly at the age of two to three years, during the development of motor coordination. When primary teeth are injured, the resulting treatment prioritises the safety of the adult tooth, and should avoid any risk of damaging the permanent successors. This is because the root apex of an injured primary tooth lies near the tooth germ of the adult tooth.

Therefore, a displaced primary tooth will be removed if it is found to have encroached upon the developing adult tooth germ. If this happens, parents should be advised of possible complications such as enamel hypoplasia, hypocalcification, crown/root dilaceration, or disruptions in tooth eruption sequence.

Potential sequelae can involve pulpal necrosis, pulp obliteration and root resorption. Necrosis is the most common complication and an assessment is generally made based on the colour supplemented with radiograph monitoring. A change in colour may mean that the tooth is still vital but if this persists it is likely to be non-vital.

=== Permanent teeth ===
==== Dental injuries ====
Dental injury	Clinical findings	Radiographic findings	Treatment	Follow-up
1) Enamel infraction	A crack in enamel with no loss of tooth structure Tooth is not tender	No abnormalities	Generally no treatment needed Discolouration of prominent cracks can be prevented by etching and sealing with resin	No follow-up required
2) Enamel fracture	Fracture involving enamel only Tooth not tender with normal mobility and pulpal response	Loss of enamel May need lip or cheek x-ray to locate tooth fragments or other materials	If available, tooth fragment can be bonded back onto the tooth If not available, tooth can be restored with composite resin	6–8 weeks: clinical and radiographic examination 1 year: clinical and radiographic examination
3) Enamel-dentine fracture	Fracture involving both enamel and dentine without pulp exposure Tooth not tender with normal mobility and pulpal response	Loss of enamel and dentine May need lip or cheek x-ray to locate tooth fragments or other materials	If available, tooth fragment can be bonded back onto the tooth If not available, tooth can be restored with composite resin If dentine is within 0.5mm of the pulp, calcium hydroxide placed and covered with glass ionomer	6–8 weeks: clinical and radiographic examination 1 year: clinical and radiographic examination
4) Enamel-dentine-pulp fracture	Fracture involving enamel and dentine with pulp exposure Tooth not tender with normal mobility Exposed pulp will be sensitive to stimuli	Loss of enamel and dentine May need lip or cheek x-ray to locate tooth fragments or other materials	In developing teeth, preserve pulp vitality by pulp capping or partial pulpotomy using calcium hydroxide In mature teeth, root canal treatment is usually performed	6–8 weeks: clinical and radiographic examination 1 year: clinical and radiographic examination
5) Crown-root fracture without pulp involvement	Fracture involving enamel, dentine and cementum without pulp exposure Fracture extends below the gum margin Tender tooth with mobile crown fragment	Fracture line extending down the root may not be visible	Emergency: aim is to stabilise the loose fragment by splinting it to adjacent teeth Non-emergency: removal of loose fragment (following gingivectomy, surgery or via orthodontics), root canal treatment and restoration with post-retained crown In extreme cases (such as a vertical fracture), tooth may need to be extracted	6–8 weeks: clinical and radiographic examination 1 year: clinical and radiographic examination
6) Crown-root fracture with pulp Involvement	Fracture involving enamel, dentine and cementum with pulp exposure Tender tooth with mobile crown fragment	Fracture line extending down the root may not be visible	Emergency: aim is to stabilise the loose fragment by splinting it to adjacent teeth In developing teeth, preserve pulp vitality by pulp capping or partial pulpotomy using calcium hydroxide In mature teeth, root canal treatment is usually performed Non-emergency: removal of loose fragment (following gingivectomy, surgery or via orthodontics), root canal treatment and restoration with post-retained crown In extreme cases (such as a vertical fracture), tooth may need to be extracted	6–8 weeks: clinical and radiographic examination 1 year: clinical and radiographic examination
7) Root fracture	Mobile or displaced crown segment Tender tooth that may be bleeding from the gum Tooth may be discoloured (red or grey)	Fracture line involving the root will be seen as well as the direction	If displaced, reposition tooth and check the position with an x-ray Flexible splint used to stabilise tooth for at least 4 weeks and then reassess tooth stability Monitor healing for at least 1 year to assess the status of the pulp Root canal treatment will be needed if pulp necrosis develops (this occurs in ~20% of root fractures)	4 weeks: splint removal, clinical and radiographic examination 6–8 weeks: clinical and radiographic examination 4 months: splint removal in cervical third fractures, clinical and radiographic examination 6 months: clinical and radiographic examination 1 year: clinical and radiographic examination 5 years: clinical and radiographic examination

==== Periodontal injuries ====
Periodontal injury	Clinical findings	Radiographic findings	Treatment	Follow-up
1) Concussion	Tender tooth with no displacement and normal mobility	No abnormalities	No treatment required	4 weeks: clinical and radiographic examination 6–8 weeks: clinical and radiographic examination 1 year: clinical and radiographic examination
2) Subluxation	Tender tooth with no displacement but increased mobility May be bleeding from the gum	No abnormalities	Usually no treatment required Can use a flexible splint to stabilise the tooth for up to 2 weeks	2 weeks: splint removal, clinical and radiographic examination 4 weeks: clinical and radiographic examination 6–8 weeks: clinical and radiographic examination 6 months: clinical and radiographic examination 1 year: clinical and radiographic examination
3) Extrusion	Tooth looks longer and is very mobile	Periodontal ligament space is increased apically	Tooth is repositioned gently in the socket Tooth stabilised with a flexible splint for 2 weeks Signs and symptoms of pulp necrosis indicates the need for root canal treatment to prevent root resorption	2 weeks: splint removal, clinical and radiographic examination 4 weeks: clinical and radiographic examination 6–8 weeks: clinical and radiographic examination 6 months: clinical and radiographic examination 1 year: clinical and radiographic examination yearly 5 years: clinical and radiographic examination
4) Lateral luxation	Tooth is displaced, most commonly towards the roof of the mouth/tongue or the lip Tooth will be immobile Tapping on the tooth will give a high-pitched, metallic (ankylotic) sound Alveolar process fracture	Periodontal ligament space is widened	Reposition the tooth using fingers or forceps to remove its "bony lock" and gently reposition it in the socket Tooth stabilised with a flexible splint for 4 weeks Signs and symptoms of pulp necrosis indicates the need for root canal treatment to prevent root resorption	2 weeks: clinical and radiographic examination 4 weeks: splint removal, clinical and radiographic examination 6–8 weeks: clinical and radiographic examination 6 months: clinical and radiographic examination 1 year: clinical and radiographic examination Yearly for 5 years: clinical and radiographic examination
5) Intrusion	Tooth is displaced into the alveolar bone Tapping on the tooth will give a high-pitched, metallic (ankylotic) sound	Absence of periodontal ligament space from part or entirety of the root Cemento-enamel junction appears more apically for the traumatised tooth	If incomplete root formation: allow time for tooth to naturally erupt but if no movement after a few weeks then start orthodontic repositioning intruded >7mm: surgical or orthodontic repositioning stabilise with flexible splint for 4 weeks after repositioning If complete root formation: intruded <3mm: allow time for natural eruption but if no movement after 2–4 weeks then reposition surgically or orthodontically intruded 3-7mm: surgical or orthodontic repositioning intruded >7mm: surgical repositioning likelihood of pulpal necrosis in these teeth so root canal therapy with temporary calcium hydroxide filling in first instance and start root canal treatment 2–3 weeks after repositioning stabilise with flexible splint for 4 weeks after repositioning	2 weeks: clinical and radiographic examination 4 weeks: splint removal, clinical and radiographic examination 6–8 weeks: clinical and radiographic examination 6 months: clinical and radiographic examination 1 year: clinical and radiographic examination Yearly for 5 years: clinical and radiographic examination
6) Avulsion	Tooth completely removed from socket	Radiograph required to ensure that missing tooth is not intruded	For information on first aid procedures for avulsed teeth, see "Management" section of this page Treatment will depend on whether the tooth has an open or closed apex and how long the tooth has been out of the mouth prior to dental clinic arrival (see Dental Trauma Guide for full treatment details)	4 weeks: splint removal, clinical and radiographic examination 3 months: clinical and radiographic examination 6 months: clinical and radiographic examination 1 year: clinical and radiographic examination yearly

== Risk factors ==
- Age, especially young children
  1. Primary dentition stage (2–3 years old, when children's motor function is developing and start learning how to walk/ run)
  2. Mixed dentition stage (8–10 years old)
  3. Permanent dentition stage (13–15 years old)
- Male > Female
- Season (Many trauma incidents occur more in summer compared to winter)
- Sports, especially contact sports such as football, hockey, rugby, basketball and skating
- Piercing in tongue and lips
- Military training
- Acute changes in the barometric pressure, i.e. dental barotrauma, which can affect scuba divers and aviators
- Class II malocclusion with increased overjet and Class II skeletal relationship and incompetent lips are the significant risk factors

== Prevention ==
Prevention in general is relatively difficult as it is nearly impossible to stop accidents from happening, especially in children who are quite active. Regular use of a gum shield during sports and other high-risk activities (such as military training) is the most effective prevention for dental trauma. They are mainly being fitted on the upper teeth as it has higher risk of dental trauma compared to the lower teeth. Gum shields ideally have to be comfortable for users, retentive, odourless, tasteless and the materials should not be causing any harm to the body. However, studies in various high-risk populations for dental injuries have repeatedly reported low compliance of individuals for the regular using of mouthguard during activities. Moreover, even with regular use, effectiveness of prevention of dental injuries is not complete, and injuries can still occur even when mouthguards are used as users are not always aware of the best makes or size, which inevitably result in a poor fit.

Types of gum shield:

- Stock ready-moulded
  - Not recommended as it does not conform the teeth at all
  - Poor retention
  - Poor fit
  - Higher risk of dislodging during contact sports and airway occlusion which may lead to respiratory distress
- Self-moulded/Boil and bite
  - Limited range of sizes, which may result in poor fitting
  - Can be easily remoulded if distorted
  - Cheap
- Custom-made
  - Made with ethylene vinyl acetate
  - The most ideal type of gum shield
  - Good retention
  - Able to build in multiple layers/laminations
  - Expensive

One of the most important measures is to impart knowledge and awareness about dental injury to those who are involved in sports environments like boxing and in school children in which they are at high risk of suffering dental trauma through an extensive educational campaign including lectures, leaflets, posters which should be presented in an easy understandable way.

== Management ==
The management depends on the type of injury involved and whether it is a baby or an adult tooth. If teeth are completely knocked out baby front teeth should not be replaced. The area should be cleaned gently and the child brought to see a dentist. Adult front teeth (which usually erupt at around six years of age) can be replaced immediately if clean. If a tooth is avulsed, make sure it is a permanent tooth (primary teeth should not be replanted, and instead the injury site should be cleaned to allow the adult tooth to begin to erupt).

- Reassure the patient and keep them calm.
- If the tooth can be found, pick it up by the crown (the white part). Avoid touching the root part.
- If the tooth is dirty, wash it briefly (ten seconds) under cold running water but do not scrub the tooth.
- Place the tooth back in the socket where it was lost from, taking care to place it the correct way (matching the other tooth)
- Encourage the patient to bite on a handkerchief to hold the tooth in position.
- If it is not possible to replace the tooth immediately, ideally, the tooth should be placed in Hank's balanced salt solution, if not available, in a glass of milk or a container with the patient's saliva or in the patient's cheek (keeping it between the teeth and the inside of the cheek – note this is not suitable for young children who may swallow the tooth). Transporting the tooth in water is not recommended, as this will damage the delicate cells that make up the tooth's interior.
- Seek emergency dental treatment immediately.

When the injured teeth are painful while functioning due to damage to the periodontal ligaments (e.g., dental subluxation), a temporary splinting of the injured teeth may relieve the pain and enhance eating ability. Splinting should only be used in certain situations. Splinting in lateral and extrusive luxation had a poorer prognosis than in root fractures. An avulsed permanent tooth should be gently rinsed under tap water and immediately re-planted in its original socket within the alveolar bone and later temporarily splinted by a dentist. Failure to re-plant the avulsed tooth within the first 40 minutes after the injury may result in very poor prognosis for the tooth. Management of injured primary teeth differs from management of permanent teeth; an avulsed primary tooth should not be re-planted (to avoid damage to the permanent dental crypt). This is due to the close proximity of the apex of a primary tooth to the permanent tooth underneath. The permanent dentition can suffer from tooth malformation, impacted teeth and eruption disturbances due to trauma to primary teeth. The priority should always be reducing potential damage to the underlying permanent dentition.

For other injuries, it is important to keep the area clean by using a soft toothbrush and antiseptic mouthwash such as chlorhexidine gluconate. Soft foods and avoidance of contact sports is also recommended in the short term. Dental care should be sought as quickly as possible.

=== Splinting ===
A tooth that has experienced trauma may become loose due to the periodontal ligament becoming damaged or fracture to the root of the tooth. Splinting ensures that the tooth is held in the correct position within the socket, ensuring that no further trauma occurs to enable healing. A splint can either be flexible or rigid. Flexible splints do not completely immobilise the traumatised tooth and still allow for functional movement. Contrastingly, rigid splints completely immobilise the traumatised tooth. The International Association of Dental Traumatology (IADT) guidelines recommend the use of flexible, non-rigid splints for a short duration by stating that both periodontal and pulpal healing is encouraged if the traumatised tooth is allowed slight movement and if the splinting time is not too long.

== Complications ==
Not all sequelae of trauma are immediate and many of them can occur months or years after the initial incident thus required prolonged follow-up. Common complications are pulpal necrosis, pulpal obliteration, root resorption and damage to the successors teeth in primary teeth dental trauma. The most common complication was pulp necrosis (34.2%). 50% of the tooth that have trauma related to avulsion experienced ankylotic root resorption after a median TIC (time elapsed between the traumatic event and the diagnosis of complications) of 1.18 years. Teeth that have multiple traumatic events also showed to have higher chance of pulp necrosis (61.9%) compared to teeth that experienced a single traumatic injury (25.3%) in the studies (1)

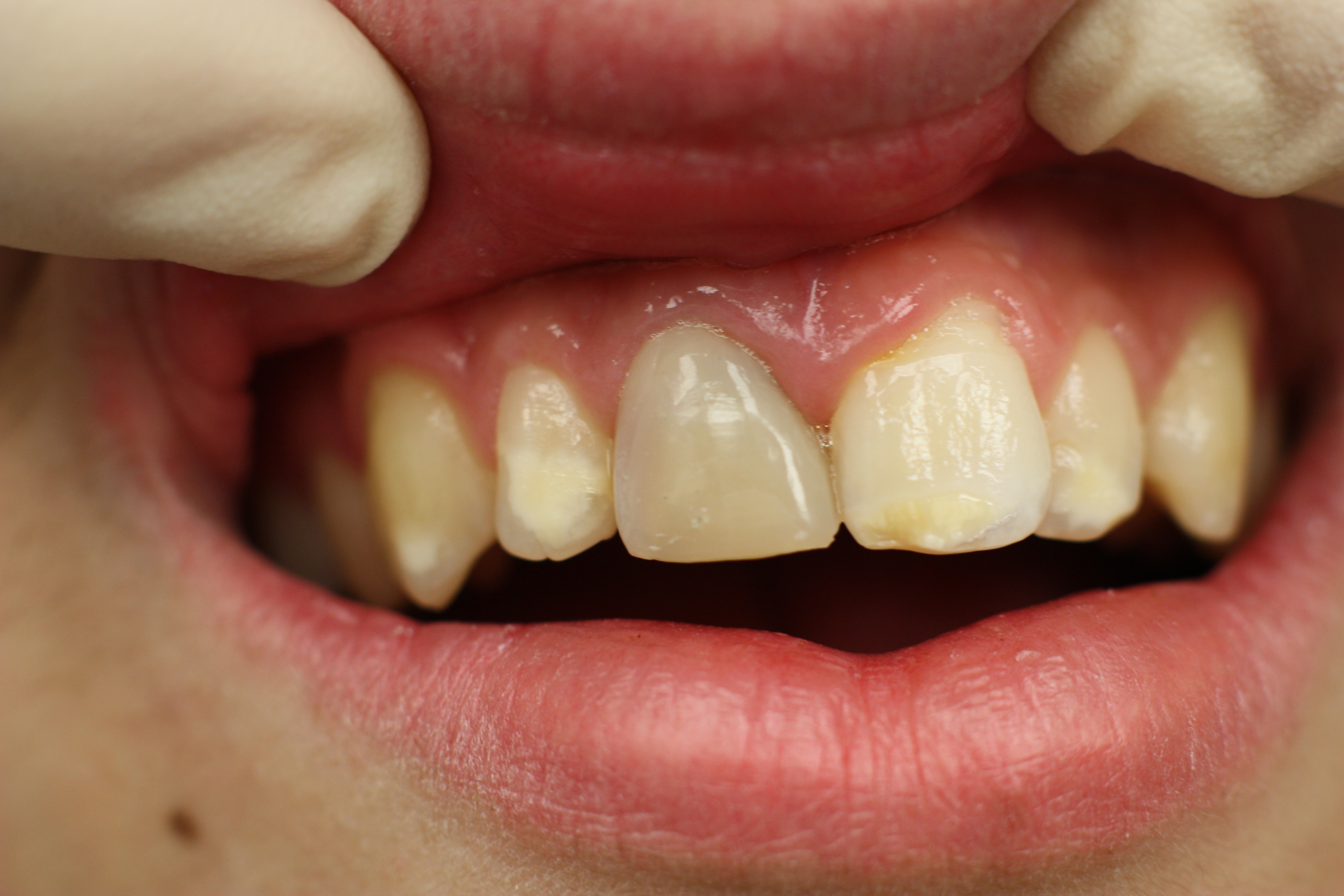
Image shows a grey discoloured upper right front incisor, usually indicating that the tooth is non-vital

=== Pulpal necrosis ===
Pulp necrosis usually occurs either as ischaemic necrosis (infarction) caused by disruption to the blood supply at the apical foramen or as an infection-related liquefactive necrosis following dental trauma (2). Signs of pulpal necrosis include

- Persistent grey colour to tooth that does not fade
- Radiographic signs of periapical inflammation
- Clinical signs of infection: tenderness, sinus, suppuration, swelling

Treatment options will be extraction for the primary tooth. For the permanent tooth, endodontic treatment can be considered.

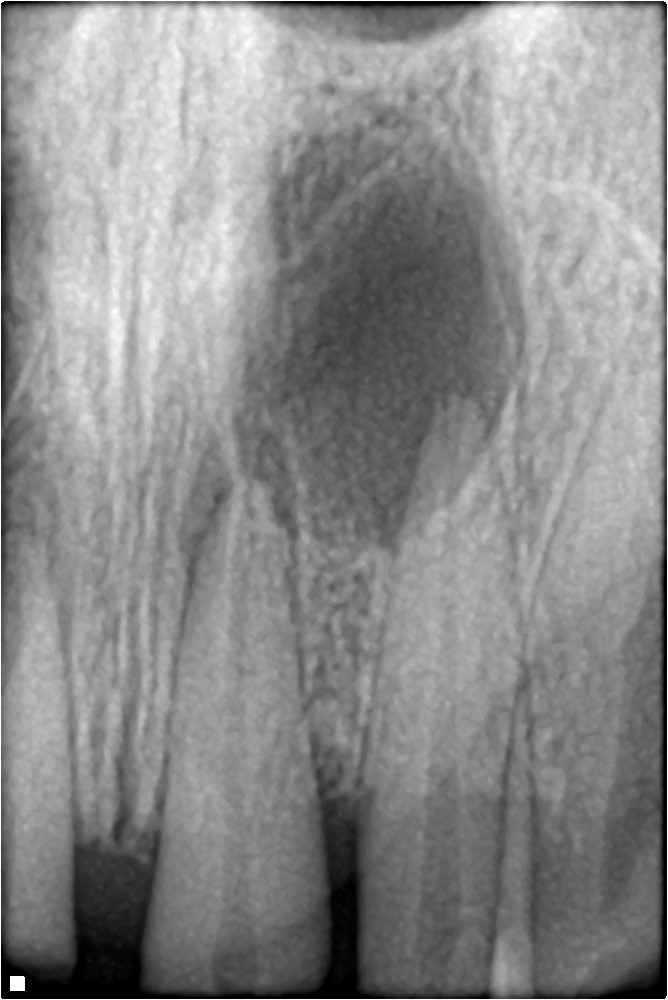
Radiographic signs of periapical inflammation is usually evident in a tooth with necrotic pulp

=== Root resorption ===
Root resorption following traumatic dental injuries, whether located along the root surface or within the root canal appears to be a sequel to wound healing events, where a significant amount of the PDL or pulp has been lost due to the effect of acute trauma.

=== Pulpal obliteration ===
4–24% of traumatized teeth will have some degrees of pulpal obliteration that is characterized by the loss of pulpal space radiographically and yellow discolouration of the clinical crown. No treatment is needed if it is asymptomatic. Treatment options will be extraction for symptomatic primary tooth. For symptomatic permanent tooth, root canal treatment is often challenging because the pulp chamber is filled with calcified material and the drop-off sensation of entering a pulp chamber will not occur.

=== Damage to the successor teeth ===
Dental trauma to the primary teeth might cause damage to the permanent teeth. Damage to the permanent teeth especially during development stage might have following consequences:

- Crown dilaceration
- Odontoma-like malformation
- Sequestration of permanent tooth germs
- Root dilaceration
- Arrest of root formation

== Epidemiology ==
Dental trauma is most common in younger people, accounting for 17% of injuries to the body in those aged 0–6 years compared to an average of 5% across all ages. It is more frequently observed in males compared to females. Traumatic dental injuries are more common in permanent teeth compared to deciduous teeth and usually involve the front teeth of the upper jaw.

"The oral region comprises 1% of the total body area, yet it accounts for 5% of all bodily injuries. In preschool children, oral injuries make up as much as 17% of all bodily injuries. The incidence of traumatic dental injuries is 1–3%, and the prevalence is steady at 20–30%."

Almost 30% of the children in pre-school have mostly experienced trauma to primary teeth. Dental injuries involving the permanent teeth happen to almost 25% of children in school and 30% of adults. The incident varies in different countries as well as within the country itself. Dental traumatic accidents depends on one's activity status and also the surrounding environment factor but these are the main predisposing risk factor compared to a person's age and gender.

Trauma is the most common cause of loss of permanent incisors in childhood. Dental trauma often leads to complications such as pulpal necrosis, and it is nearly impossible to predict the long-term prognosis of the injured tooth; the injury often results in long-term restorative problems.

== See also ==
- Cracked tooth syndrome
- Dental barotrauma – Damage to a tooth caused by a change of ambient pressure
