= Dental intrusion =

Dental injury

- Other names: Intrusive luxation
- Specialty: Dentistry, Oral and maxillofacial surgery
- Symptoms: Shortened appearance of tooth, lack of mobility, metallic sound on percussion
- Complications: Pulp necrosis, Root resorption, Ankylosis (dentistry)
- Treatment: Spontaneous re-eruption, orthodontic repositioning, surgical repositioning
- Prognosis: Variable; high risk of pulp and periodontal damage

Dental intrusion is an apical displacement of the tooth into the alveolar bone. This injury is accompanied by extensive damage to periodontal ligament, cementum, disruption of the neurovascular supply to the pulp, and communication or fracture of the alveolar socket.

Intrusive traumas have been found to comprise 0.3-1.9% of the traumas affecting permanent dentition.

== Diagnosis ==
In most cases of intrusion with fully erupted permanent dentition, diagnosis can be made by comparing incisal height of teeth next to the injured one. In cases with mixed dentition, a percussion test must be performed as an intruded tooth can mimic an erupting tooth.

=== Clinical and radiographical presentation ===
Clinical findings show shortened crown length to various degree and up to no visible crown in severe cases. Tooth is immobile, and percussion gives high, metallic sound. Bleeding around crown margins can be observed.

Radiographical findings shows dislocation of root in an apical direction, and periodontal ligament space is not continuous or can disappear completely.

== Management ==
Management of intrusion depends on several factors such as whether the tooth has a closed or open apex, type of teeth (primary or permanent dentition) and how much the tooth is intruded in mm. This type of dental trauma is complex and is commonly associated with pulpal necrosis and inflammatory ankylosis. Management is focused on reducing this effect and is commonly achieved by root canal treatment.

=== Primary teeth ===
Primary teeth presentation on examination	Treatment options
Tooth displaced labially	Leave for spontaneous reposition
Tooth intruded horizontally with apex displaced into developing tooth germ	Extract

=== Permanent teeth ===
Teeth with incomplete root formation	Treatment options
Intrusion of up to 7mm	Allow eruption without intervention. If no movement is seen within few weeks, must be repositioned orthodontically
Intrusion more than 7mm	Must be repositioned using surgical or orthodontic approach.

Teeth with complete root formation	Treatment options
Intrusion less than 3mm	Allow time for spontaneous eruption: If no movement within 2–4 weeks, surgical or orthodontic reposition required to avoid ankylosis
Intrusion between 3-7mm	Surgical or orthodontic reposition required
Intrusion more than 7mm	Surgical reposition required

Intruded teeth with closed apex will likely become necrotic. Recommended root canal therapy within 2–3 weeks after repositioning. Where surgical or orthodontic reposition required, after repositioning tooth must be stabilize with a flexible splint for 4 weeks.

=== Follow-up ===
Frequent follow up appointments are required to monitor healing process clinically and radiographically:

- 2 weeks → 4 weeks→ 6–8 weeks→ 6 months→ 1 year → Yearly for 5 years

== See also ==
Dental trauma
