= Julius Bruck =

German dentist (1840–1902)

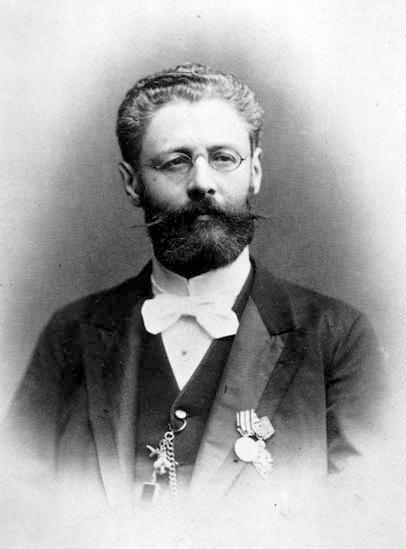
Julius Bruck (1840-1902)

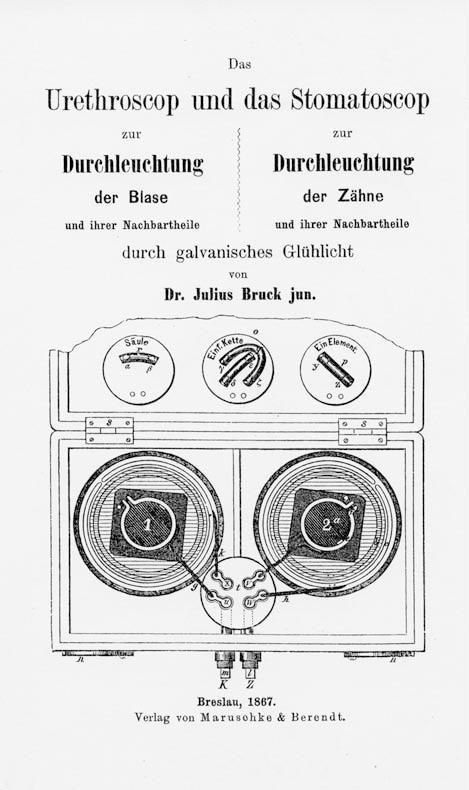
Urethroscop and Stomatoscop

Julius Bruck (October 6, 1840 – April 20, 1902) was a German dentist who was a native of Breslau.

He studied dentistry and medicine at the Universities of Breslau, Berlin, Bonn and Paris; obtaining a degree in dentistry from Berlin in 1858. Afterwards he worked as an assistant to his father, Jonas Bruck (1813-1883) in Breslau. In 1871 he became privat-docent at the University of Breslau, and in 1891 was awarded with an honorary professorship.

In 1867 Bruck designed a water-cooled diaphanoscopic instrument for translumination of the bladder via the rectum. This instrument consisted of an illuminated platinum thread inserted into a double glass wall cylinder with the instrument's outer glass chamber cooled by water.

== Selected publications ==
- Die Krankheiten des Zahnfleisches (Diseases of the gums)
- Beiträge zur Pathologie und Histologie der Zahnpulpa (Contributions to the pathology and histology of the dental pulp)
- Ueber Angeborene und Erworbene Defekte des Gesichts und des Kiefers (Regarding congenital and acquired defects of the face and jaw)
- Das Urethroscop und Stomatoscop Durch Galvanisches Glühlicht (The urethroscope and stomatoscope by galvanic incandescent light)
