= Dental subluxation =

- Specialty: Dentistry

Dental subluxation is a traumatic injury to the periodontal tissue in which the tooth has increased mobility (i.e., is loosened) but has not been displaced from its tooth socket.

== Cause ==
High impact force during trauma causes damage to the periodontium and results swelling and bleeding from the gingival sulcus. Trauma also causes rupture of some periodontal fibres and this leads to loosening of the tooth. However, the force is not strong enough to cause displacement of the tooth from its socket. Sometimes, the trauma might cause pulpal damage and there is a minimal risk of pulpal necrosis, thus follow-up is essential.

== Diagnosis ==
A tooth that has been subluxated shows symptoms of being tender to percussion (tapped using the end of the mirror) and tender to palpate around the area and sulcus (as it has been slightly mobilised yet remains undisplaced). Any sensitivity testing of the pulp may provide a negative response, in which case it is important to continue monitoring until a pulpal response is received.

Radiographically, there are no unusual features to note in a subluxated tooth. However, it is important to focus on the full image and scan for any other areas which may have also been affected. If there is any suspicion of a root fracture, it is recommended to take an occlusal exposure radiograph to allow for a definitive diagnosis. Radiographs can be referred to in case of any future complications.

== Management ==
Following any form of dental trauma, a full and thorough clinical assessment is carried out to exclude more serious injuries that may require urgent management.

The first stage of the clinical assessment is to take a complete history to rule out head injury or inhalation of particles. Questions to obtain this information include:

- Did the patient lose consciousness?
- Were there any witnesses?
- Has the patient had any nausea or vomiting since the incident?
- Is there any loss of memory?
- Can all particles be accounted for
- Is the patient experiencing any change in vision?

If there is any doubt of head injury or aspiration, the patient should attend the nearest accident and emergency service prior to receiving dental treatment.

Having ruled out serious injuries, a full trauma, dental and medical history is undertaken. This will include understanding if the patient is currently having symptoms, has a history of dental trauma, and their tetanus status.

Following a complete history, a clinical examination is then undertaken.

Extra-oral examination includes:

- Cleaning cuts with saline solution and removal of foreign bodies
- Palpation of the entire facial skeleton to rule out fractures
- Assessment for abnormalities in mandibular opening
- Checking for bruising

Intra-oral examination includes checking for:

- Bruising
- Blood clots
- Cuts/ lacerations
- Tooth mobility
- Fractured teeth
- Changes to occlusion

=== Primary teeth ===
Following subluxation of a primary tooth, there is no active treatment required. The patient is advised to keep the area as clean as possible by swabbing with 0.12% chlorohexidine twice daily. Clinical follow up will be carried out at 1 week and 6–8 weeks after injury. Follow up radiographs are not required unless complications occur.

=== Secondary teeth ===
Management is similar to primary teeth. No active treatment is usually required; however, a flexible splint may be placed for up to 2 weeks if the patient is experiencing extreme discomfort. Follow up to check for complications is more frequent. Radiographical and clinical exam should be carried out at 2 weeks, 4 weeks, 6–8 weeks, 6 months and 1 year.

== Epidemiology ==
Dental trauma is a major global health issue and it affects 17.5% of children and adolescents. It is most commonly seen in school children. Dental subluxation is one of the most common traumatic injuries in primary dentition. Maxillary central incisors are the most commonly affected teeth. Some studies have proposed that the resilience nature of periodontium favours dislocation than fracture of the tooth itself. However, the exact prevalence is difficult to be assessed because dental subluxations are often asymptomatic or only mildly symptomatic, and even overlooked by caregivers when treating more serious dental traumas in adjacent teeth.

== See also ==
- Dental trauma
- Subluxation
