= Barodontalgia =

Tooth pain caused by ambient pressure change

- Other names: Aerodontalgia, dental barotrauma
- Specialty: Hyperbaric medicine

Barodontalgia, commonly known as tooth squeeze, is a pain in a tooth caused by a change in ambient pressure. The pain usually ceases at return to the original pressure. Dental barotrauma is a condition in which such changes in ambient pressure cause damage to the dentition.

== Description ==
The most common subjects are underwater divers because in deep dives pressures can increase by several atmospheres, and military pilots because of rapid changes. In pilots, barodontalgia may be severe enough to cause premature cessation of flights.

Most of the available data regarding barodontalgia is derived from high-altitude chamber simulations rather than actual flights. Barodontalgia prevalence was between 0.7% and 2% in the 1940s, and 0.3% in the 1960s.

Similarly, cases of barodontalgia were reported in 0.3% of high altitude-chamber simulations in the Luftwaffe.

The rate of barodontalgia was about 1 case per 100 flight-years in the Israeli Air Force. During World War II, about one-tenth of American aircrews had one or more episodes of barodontalgia. In a recent study, 8.2% of 331 Israeli Air Force aircrews, reported at least one episode of barodontalgia.

In addition, a large epidemiologic study suggested that changes in barometric pressure were the reason for the initiation and/or exacerbation of various oral pains observed in dental emergency departments.

Barodontalgia is a symptom of dental disease, for example inflammatory cyst in the mandible. Indeed, most of the common oral pathologies have been reported as possible sources of barodontalgia: dental caries, defective tooth restoration, pulpitis, pulp necrosis, apical periodontitis, periodontal pockets, impacted teeth, and mucous retention cysts. One exception is barodontalgia manifested as referred pain from barosinusitis or barotitis-media. The latter two conditions are generated from pressure changes rather than pressure-related flare-up of pre-existing conditions. A meta-analysis of studies conducted between 2001 and 2010 revealed a rate of 5 episodes/1,000 flight-years. Maxillary and mandibular dentitions were affected equally in flight, but in diving, maxillary dentition was affected more than the mandibular dentition, which can indicate a greater role for maxillary sinus pathology in diving barodontalgia. Surprisingly, despite cabin pressurization, the current in-flight barodontalgia incidence is similar to the incidence in the first half of the 20th century. Also, despite the greater fluctuation in divers' pressures, the weighted incidence of barodontalgia among aircrews is similar to the weighted incidence among divers. Furthermore, contrary to common belief, and in contrast to diving conditions, the role of facial barotrauma in the cause of in-flight barodontalgia is only minor (about one-tenth of cases).

== Classification ==
The Fédération dentaire internationale describes 4 classes of barodontalgia. The classes are based on signs and symptoms. They also provide specific recommendations for therapeutic intervention.

== Barotrauma ==
Sometimes, pressure changes damage teeth (rather than just causing pain). When the external pressure rises or falls and the trapped air within the void cannot expand or contract to balance the external pressure, the pressure difference on the rigid structure of the tooth can occasionally induce stresses sufficient to fracture the tooth or dislodge a filling. Typically this is seen in underwater divers or aviators who experience pressure changes in the course of their activity. Identifying the pain during a pressure change is a diagnostic indicator for the clinician. Treatment involves removing the void space by carefully replacing the offending restoration, repeating the endodontic treatment or removing the tooth.

== See also ==
- Barotrauma – Injury due to pressure difference between gas filled space and adjoining tissue
- Dental trauma – Injury to the teeth or surrounding tissues
- List of diving hazards and precautions – Hazards associated with underwater diving
- Toothache – Medical condition of the teeth
