= Dilaceration =

- Specialty: Dentistry

Dilaceration is a developmental disturbance in shape of teeth. It refers to an angulation, or a sharp bend or curve, in the root or crown of a formed tooth. This disturbance is more likely to affect the maxillary incisors and occurs in permanent dentition. Although this may seem more of an aesthetics issue, an impacted maxillary incisor will cause issues related to occlusion, phonetics, mastication, and psychology on young patients.

== Description ==
The condition is thought to be due to trauma or possibly a delay in tooth eruption relative to bone remodeling gradients during the period in which tooth is forming. The result is that the position of the calcified portion of the tooth is changed and the remainder of the tooth is formed at an angle.

The curve or bend may occur anywhere along the length of the tooth, sometimes at the cervical portion, at other times midway along the root or even just at the apex of the root, depending upon the amount of root formed when the injury occurred.

Such an injury to a permanent tooth, resulting in dilaceration, often follows traumatic injury to the deciduous predecessor in which that tooth is driven apically into the jaw.

== Signs and symptoms ==
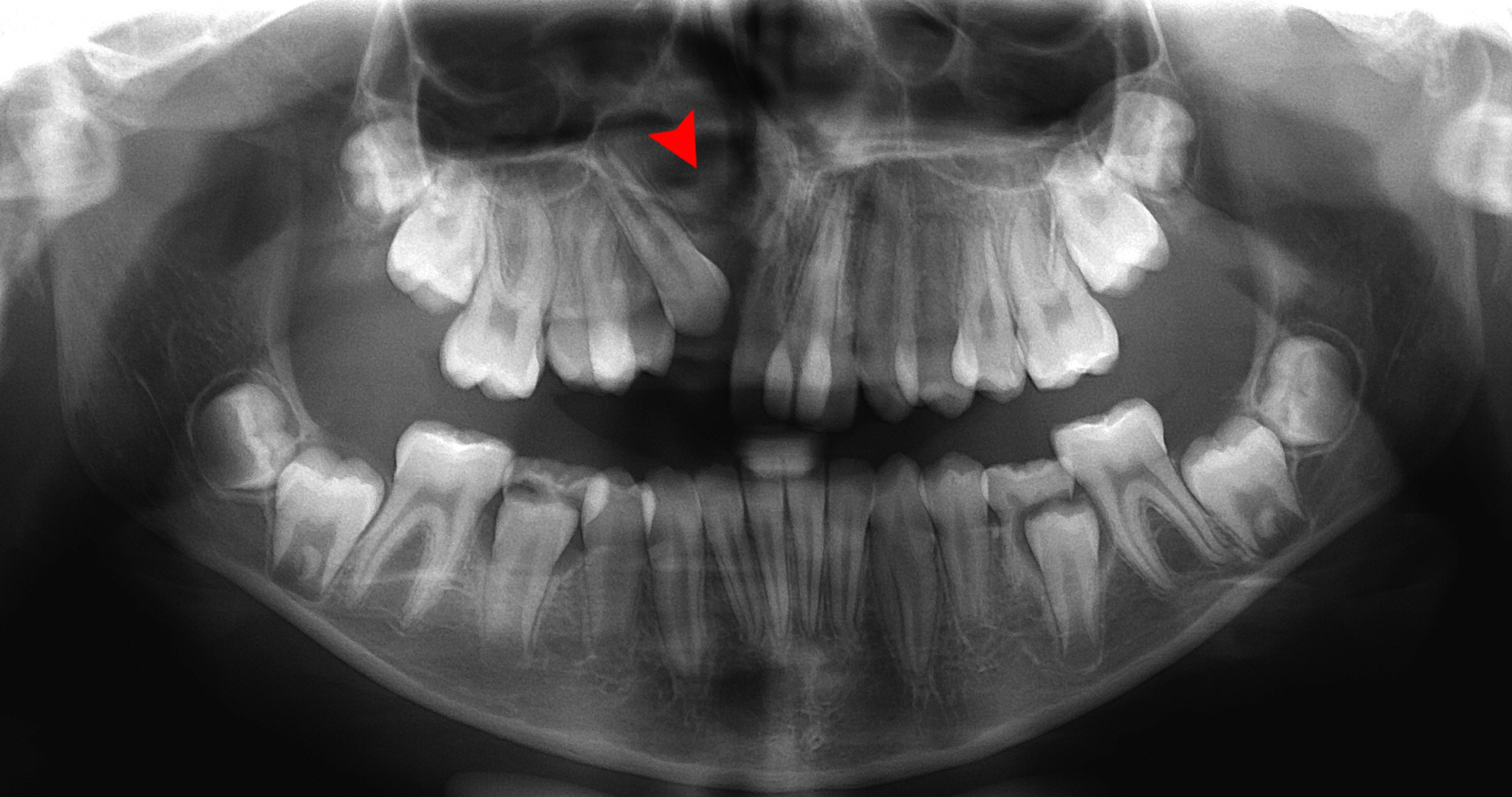
This image can be used as a reference point for dilaceration. As can be seen in this panorex image of a cleft palate, among the mixed dentition, all of the teeth remain to have straighter roots. Slight curves are common among the molars, however, there are no extreme curves or bends along the length of the teeth. Dilaceration would appear far more obviously in a radiograph

Pressure or pain in the jaw area can be associated with dilaceration. Checking in with a general dentist and an endodontist should be done if a patient feels these symptoms. Signs in radiographic imaging will indicate a bend in the tooth's root as opposed to a straight growth. Dilaceration of the crown, the top part of the teeth that we see when we smile, can be visually seen for diagnosis. Crown dilaceration will present itself as a tooth that is angled to face outward or inward. It will be a non axial displacement and more of a longitudinal displacement.

== Cause ==
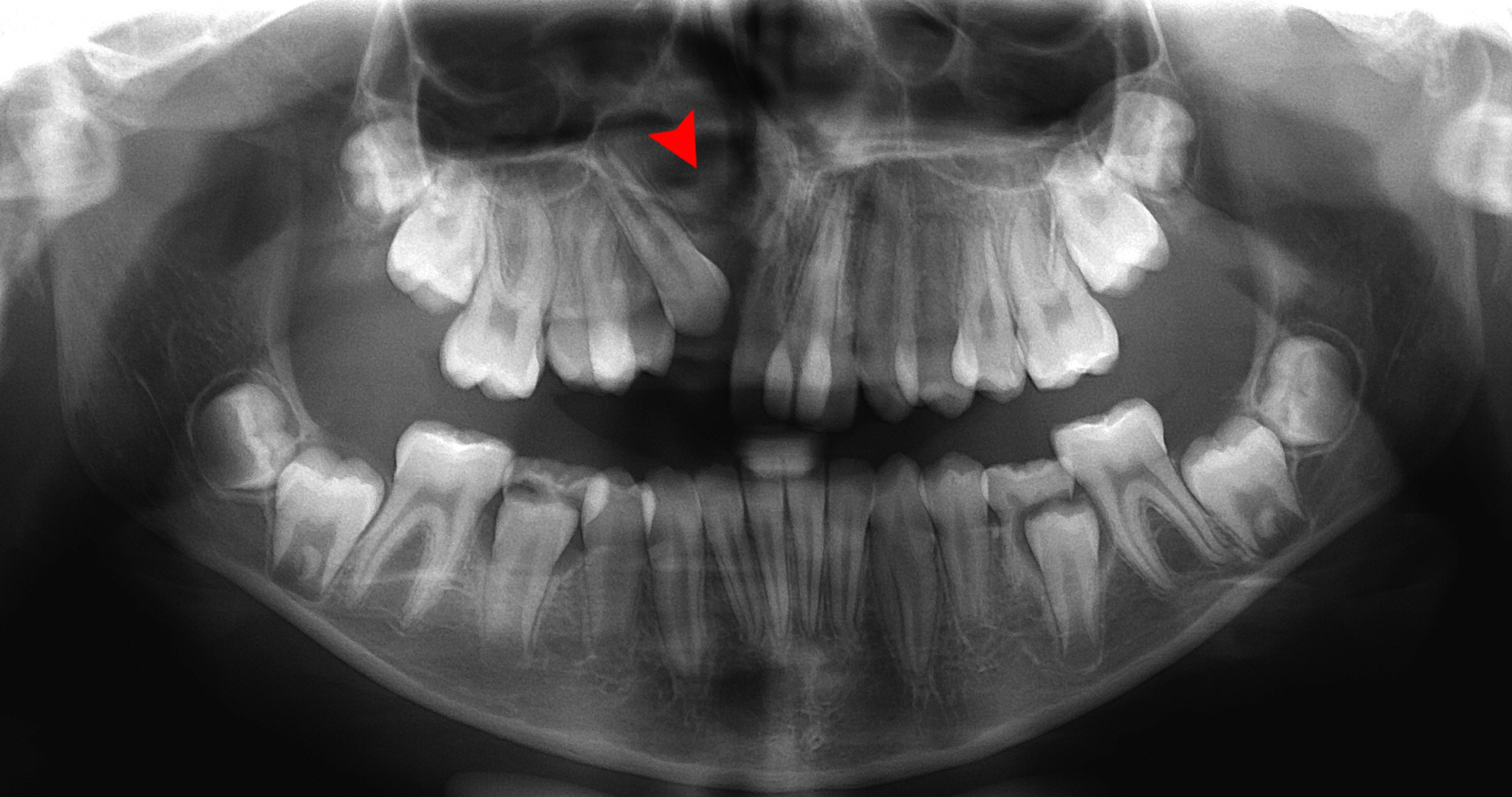
This image is used to orient on the formation of primary and permanent teeth. Focusing on the lower teeth in this xray, you may notice it seems that some small teeth are floating on top of larger more developed teeth. These floating teeth are primary teeth while the teeth with longer more developed roots are the permanent teeth.

The etiology of dilaceration is not very commonly known. However, it is thought to be related to:

- Traumatic injury that may have taken place to the deciduous teeth, also known as baby teeth.
- Idiopathic developmental disturbance, meaning it is unknown
- An ankylosed deciduous tooth, meaning a baby tooth that is permanently attached to the jaw bone
- And the presence of supernumerary teeth, meaning an individual that is born with extra teeth
- Smith-Magenis syndrome
- Axenfeld-Rieger syndrome
- Cysts
- Tumors

== Mechanism/ Pathophysiology ==
During the developmental stages, the permanent tooth germ, specifically of the maxillary incisor lies superior to the apex of the primary incisor. If there is damage to the primary incisor, this will cause an impact on the permanent incisor as well as there is only about a 3mm space of thickness between the primary and permanent teeth. In the human mouth, once the permanent teeth begin to develop, they remain underneath the primary teeth. Once they are ready to erupt they push upward eventually causing the primary teeth to fall out. There is essentially a small space between the permanent and primary teeth, roughly less than 3mm of spacing. If a young child is to experience trauma to the mouth, this can cause developmental disorders to the permanent tooth that is still developing and lying direction underneath it. The impact from the primary tooth will be transferred to the permanent tooth that may have its roots formed, thus causing a bend or curvature of the permanent tooth root. It is noted that rather than the force of the impact, the direction in which the impact occurs has a more significant effect on dilaceration formation. Cysts or tumors can cause dilaceration as well. As a tumor or cyst forms it may cause impaction on the growth and development of the permanent teeth as well. This may cause crown or root dilaceration as the tooth tries to grow around the cysts or tumor causing dramatic angulation. Similarly, patients present with supernumerary teeth, may have impacted the growth of underlying permanent teeth causing the abnormal root curvature growth. An ankylosed deciduous tooth will not allow for proper growth the permanent tooth. Thus, the tooth may look for another path to erupt. This may cause dilaceration of root or may potentially impact neighboring teeth causing dilaceration to those teeth.

== Diagnosis ==
Dilaceration can be diagnosed with a simple radiograph of the affected teeth. However, if the bends are more lingual or facially present, more advance imaging techniques may be necessary. In some cases a cone-bean CT scan may be useful to create a three dimensional view.

== Prevention/ Treatment ==
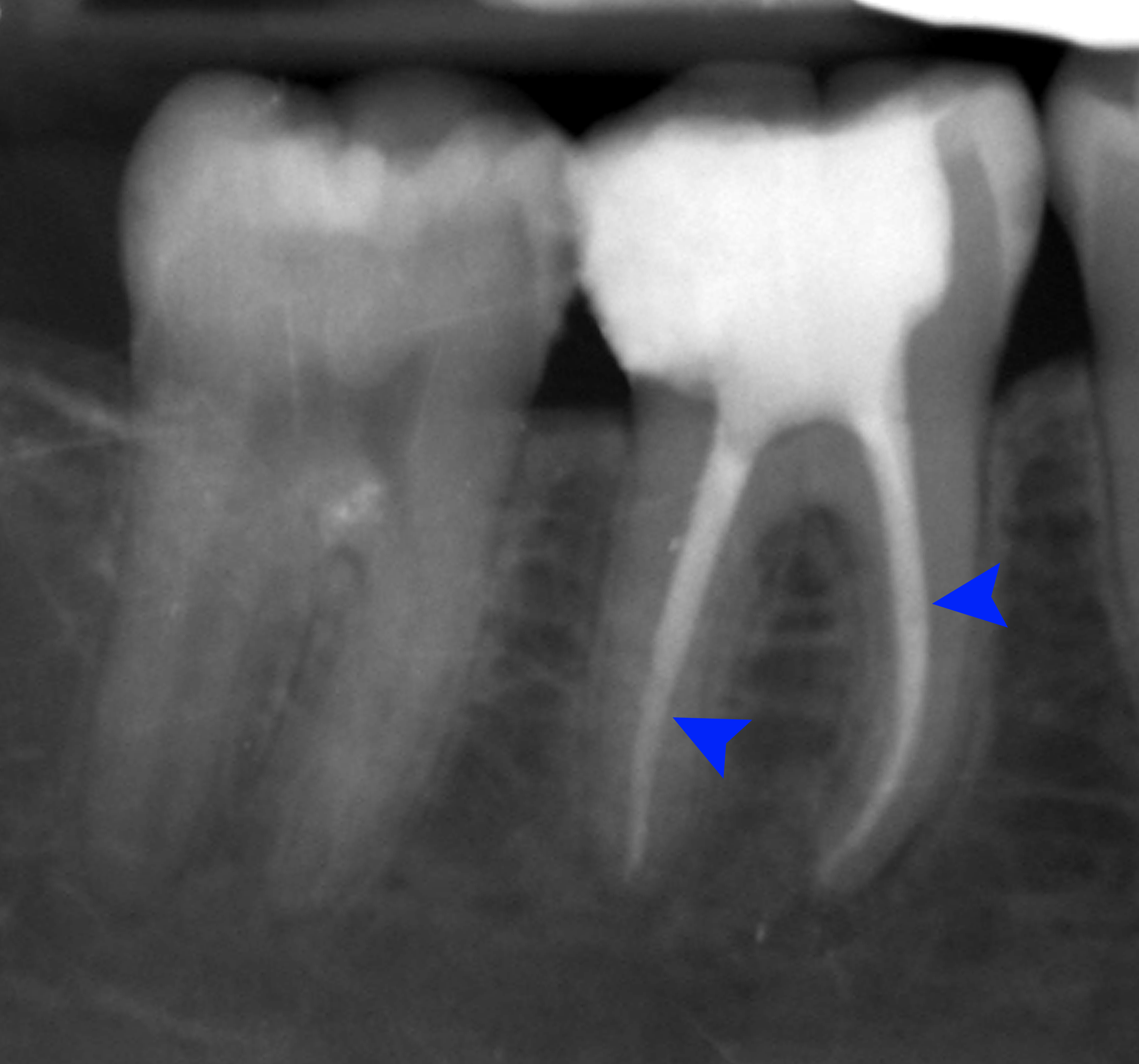
This radiograph shows a root canal treatment with no crown completed. This is a possible course of treatment for dilacerated teeth. The slight curves shown on these molar teeth are normal curves. Extreme curvature of roots are known to be dilaceration.

There are currently no preventative measures to be taken for dilaceration as the etiology is not well known. However, there are some treatment options that may serve to be of use. A surgical method which involves the exposing the impacted tooth to meet with normal occlusion with the help of orthodontic traction. Although this surgical method has proven to be of use in the past, it may not be the case for every patient with dilacerated teeth. Thus the degree of dilaceration is dependent on what kind of treatment can take place. In young children many cases of dilaceration occur due to some kind of trauma to the tooth, commonly causing dislocation of the tooth affecting its direction and growth. Once a trauma has occurred dilaceration can be prevented by yearly visits to the dentist and maintaining radiographic images to note any changes that may occur. If changes do occur, treatment can be done through orthodontic treatment or the tooth may be completely extracted by a dentist to prevent impaction on permanent teeth. Prevention for young children also includes avoiding injury to the mouth, especially during sporting activities, proper headgear and protective measures should be taken prior to engaging in recreational activities for the overall safety of the child. Patients with supernumerary teeth may also be candidates for teeth extraction followed by orthodontic treatment to prevent dilaceration. In some cases and Endodontist, a tooth root specialist, may be involved in treatment of dilaceration. Using radiographs to determine the extent of dilaceration, the endodontist may recommend a root canal treatment, which is essentially cleaning out the nerve of the tooth and placing material inside the tooth to help maintain its structure. Since at this point the tooth with no nerve is essentially dead, further treatment from a general dentist to crown the tooth will be necessary. Crowning the tooth will prevent breakage of the tooth while still allowing functionality of the tooth. In order to achieve the best possible results, treatment should begin as soon as possible.

== Prognosis ==
The prognosis will vary from each patients case to case. In less severe cases, patients may face minor issues with aesthetics which orthodontic treatment can resolve. In more severe cases which are not as easily treatable patients may face more severe issues with occlusions and phonetics. In some cases young children may face psychological issues. Patients may face some difficulties as time progresses and if they are left untreated. Other teeth may become impacted and cause pain and soreness.

== Epidemiology ==
Most commonly affects patients in their permanent dentition. It may also appear in primary teeth however, its incidence rate is significantly lower. Some studies indicate that dilaceration is not more common in any gender however, other studies indicate that incidence rate is more common in females than males with a ratio of 1:6. There are reports of a 0.53% for this to occur on the two front teeth of the upper jaw. In a study conducted on the adult population in Croatia, the most common teeth to experience dilaceration were the lower jaw's 3rd molars with a whopping 24.1%. Next was the upper jaw's first, second and third molars at 15.3%,11.4% and 8.1% incidence rate respectively.

== Research Directions ==
Although this disease is rare there has been a significant amount of research done on this.

- A 2016 study was done to find reasoning behind dilacerated crowns and treatment options for different types of crown dilacerations. Researchers found that dental trauma should not be taken lightly as it is one of the most common caused for dilaceration. Researchers also concluded that if trauma has occurred to primary teeth, it should be followed up with the dentist on a regular basis due to the future complications that may arise. The main focus of treatment in this research was root canal therapy over surgical methods as it was less invasive and more conservative.
- A research review published in 2016 indicated that a multidisciplinary approach was more favorable in diagnosing and treatment of dilaceration. Researchers presented that although dilaceration of permanent teeth is rare, it can pose many issues. Therefore, rather than just simply having clinical follow ups and standard imaging conducted, to reach a proper diagnosis imaging tools such as a CBCT should be used. Additionally, treatment requires patient compliance as well as early treatment wherever possible. Treatment options may include exposure of the tooth followed by orthodontic treatment to bring the tooth to a corrected positioning.
- A 2014 case report indicated a young patient approached the pediatric dental department complaining of upper teeth that had still not come in yet. It was found that the patient had experienced a trauma, thus had completed extractions 6 years prior. Panoramic radiographs showed the tooth was impacted and potentially had a dilacerated root. A cone beam CT scan was done to gain a better idea of the relationship of the teeth. Treatment consisted of extractions followed by orthodontic bonding and extrusion of the tooth. This allowed for other teeth to come into better places as well.
- A research study conducted from 2005 to 2010 was conducted in South Iran to check for the presence of dilacerations. Records were compiled from the endodontic and periodontal departments of Shiraz University of Medical Science's dental school. All patients were Caucasian ranging from 12 to 75 years if age. Researchers found dilaceration in 0.3% of teeth among 7.2% of patients. Distribution was equal between the lower and upper jaw. Researchers concluded that root dilacerations mainly occur in posterior teeth.

== See also ==
- Tooth enamel
- Turner's hypoplasia
