= Transillumination =

Imaging technique

Transillumination is the technique of sample illumination by transmission of light through the sample. Transillumination is used in a variety of methods of imaging.

== Microscopy ==
In microscopy transillumination refers to the illumination of a sample by transmitted light. In its most basic form it generates a bright field image, and is commonly used with transillumination techniques such as phase contrast and differential interference contrast microscopy.

== Medicine ==
In medicine transillumination generally refers to the transmission of light through tissues of the body. A common example is the transmission of light through fingers, producing a red glow due to red blood cells absorbing other wavelengths of light. Organs analysed include the sinuses, the breasts and the testes. It is widely used by pediatricians to shine light in bodies of infants and observe the amount of scattered light. Since their skeleton is not fully calcified, light can easily penetrate tissues. Common examples of diagnostic applications are:

=== Hydrocele ===
Failed obliteration of the processus vaginalis allows serous fluid to collect around the testes via a communicating connection between the tunica vaginalis and the peritoneum. The resulting hydrocele presents as painless enlargement of the scrotum, similar to what may be encountered with testicular neoplasms. A convenient method to differentiate the conditions is to transilluminate the scrotum, as the hydrocele will appear a soft red while a solid tumor will not transmit light. Any uncertainty should be followed up with an ultrasound.

=== Hydranencephaly (water head) ===
Hydranencephaly is a condition in which the brain's cerebral hemispheres are absent to a great degree and the remaining cranial cavity is filled with cerebrospinal fluid. Transillumination can be used to diagnose hydranencephaly. The device used in this operation is a Chun gun that uses a 150 watt projection bulb as a light source.

=== Pneumothorax (collapsed lungs) ===
Bright light penetrates the thin front chest wall and reflects off the back chest wall to indicate the degree of pneumothorax. To treat it, a physician inserts a needle attached to a syringe into the area of collapse to remove the air between lungs and chest wall, causing the lung to reinflate.

=== Meningocele and Meningomyelocele ===
There is brilliant transillumination in case of meningocele due to presence of CSF inside the cyst. Meningomyelocele, on the other hand, is partially transilluminant as it contains nerve root fibres along with the CSF.

== Dentistry ==
Bright transilluminated light can highlight dental caries and sign of dental trauma such as enamel infractions.

== Other ==
Light bright enough to penetrate the shell can be used to verify egg yolks are intact, as the yolk is opaque while the albumin is transparent.

== See also ==
- Julius Bruck, inventor of a water-cooled diaphanoscopic instrument in 1867
