= Enamel infraction =

Microcracks within the dental enamel of teeth

Enamel infraction, also known as craze lines, is a type of dental fracture that falls under the classification system based on the extent of tissue involvement and pulp exposure (Patnana and Kanchan, 2023). Dental fractures are categorized according to the affected tissue and whether the pulp is involved, with enamel infractions representing the least severe form, involving only microcracks contained within the enamel only without loss of tooth structure and are usually asymptomatic (Bonk, J., 2019). Enamel infractions are diagnosed by using transillumination and should be distinguished from cracks caused by thermal changes. Clinically, affected teeth typically show a normal response to pulp vitality tests, without mobility or periapical tissue involvement, and no sensitivity to percussion. Radiographic findings are usually unremarkable (Patnana and Kanchan, 2023).

== Epidemiology ==
Although enamel infractions are amongst the most frequently occurring dental traumas, they are often overlooked or underreported since they usually do not cause symptoms and may go unnoticed without a thorough clinical examination of radiographic assessment. Among children and adolescents, enamel infractions are a particularly common form of dental trauma. In children, dental trauma primarily occurs due to their lack of stability and the early stages of learning to walk. Demographic studies estimate that dental trauma affects approximately 17.5% of individuals in this age group, with a higher prevalence observed in males due to increased participation in physical activities and risk-taking behaviours. The leading cause of dental trauma is falls, followed by accidents, fights, and sports-related injuries (Azami-Aghdash S, Ebadifard Azar F, et al., 2015). Although more frequent in males than females, enamel infraction can affect individuals of all ages and genders. Over 75% of tooth fractures occur in the anterior teeth of the upper jaw, with the majority affecting the central incisors, followed by the lateral incisors and canines. The maxillary central and lateral incisors are particularly prone to fractures due to their position in the oral cavity (Patnana and Kanchan, 2023).

== Etiology ==
- Enamel's inflexibility: Enamel, being highly mineralized, is hard but lacks flexibility, with a flexural modulus ranging from 10-130 GPa. In contrast, dentin (flexural modulus between 10-20 GPa), the periodontal ligaments, and alveolar bone provide some flexibility, reducing the risk of excessive stress on teeth. However, when the force applied exceeds the enamel's flexural strength, cracks may initiate, potentially leading to fractures if they continue to propagate. (Smith, R., McColl, E. & Bryce, G., 2023)
- Trauma: Enamel infraction can result from acute trauma, such as accidents, physical assaults, or sports injuries. These incidents should be investigated during patient history-taking to determine their role in dental fractures. (Smith, R., McColl, E. & Bryce, G., 2023)
- Occlusal forces: The masticatory muscles can generate significant occlusal forces. Repeated or excessive occlusal stress, often linked to parafunctional habits such as bruxism, increases the risk of enamel infractions. (Smith, R., McColl, E. & Bryce, G., 2023)
- Parafunctional habits: Habits such as clenching, grinding, tapping teeth together, and chewing on nails or cheeks should be screened for, as they contribute to enamel microcracks. (Smith, R., McColl, E. & Bryce, G., 2023)
- Dietary factors: Consuming hard foods such as nuts, bones, and ice can contribute to the formation of enamel infractions by exerting excessive pressure on the enamel surface. (Smith, R., McColl, E. & Bryce, G., 2023)
- Unfavourable occlusal relationships: Malocclusion, including non-working side interferences, edge-to-edge occlusion, and improper cusp alignment, can predispose teeth to infractions. Excessive occlusal forces or unfavourable bite relationships may be indicated clinically by a history of repeated restoration failures. (Smith, R., McColl, E. & Bryce, G., 2023)
- Iatrogenic causes: Factors such as high-powered ultrasonic scaling, improper rubber dam clamp selection, excessive wedging forces during restorative procedures, and the use of dentin pins or threaded posts can contribute to crack formation. (Smith, R., McColl, E. & Bryce, G., 2023)

== Reasons ==
=== Physiological ===
Destruction processes are activated by the reaction of the surface layer to internal and external irritations. Microfractures are caused by:

- Temperature contrast created by food or environment (eg, hot tea after ice cream, smoking in the cold)
- excessive consumption of acidic fruits, juices and carbonated drinks;
- abuse of whitening toothpastes or using hard-bristle toothbrushes progression of caries or periodontitis.

=== Mechanical ===
Fracture occurs due to the forces exerted on the dental unit. The enamel is splintering:

- trauma/ injury, eg. after an unfortunate fall, bump or contusion of the jaw;
- Parafunctional habits, eg. grinding of teeth and a bad habit of chewing on hard things, such as ice cubes, pens, etc.;
- Expansion over time of the silver amalgam creates stress in the body of the dental unit. This process contributes to chipping and even deep longitudinal cracking, up to and including breaking the tooth in half.

== Signs and symptoms ==
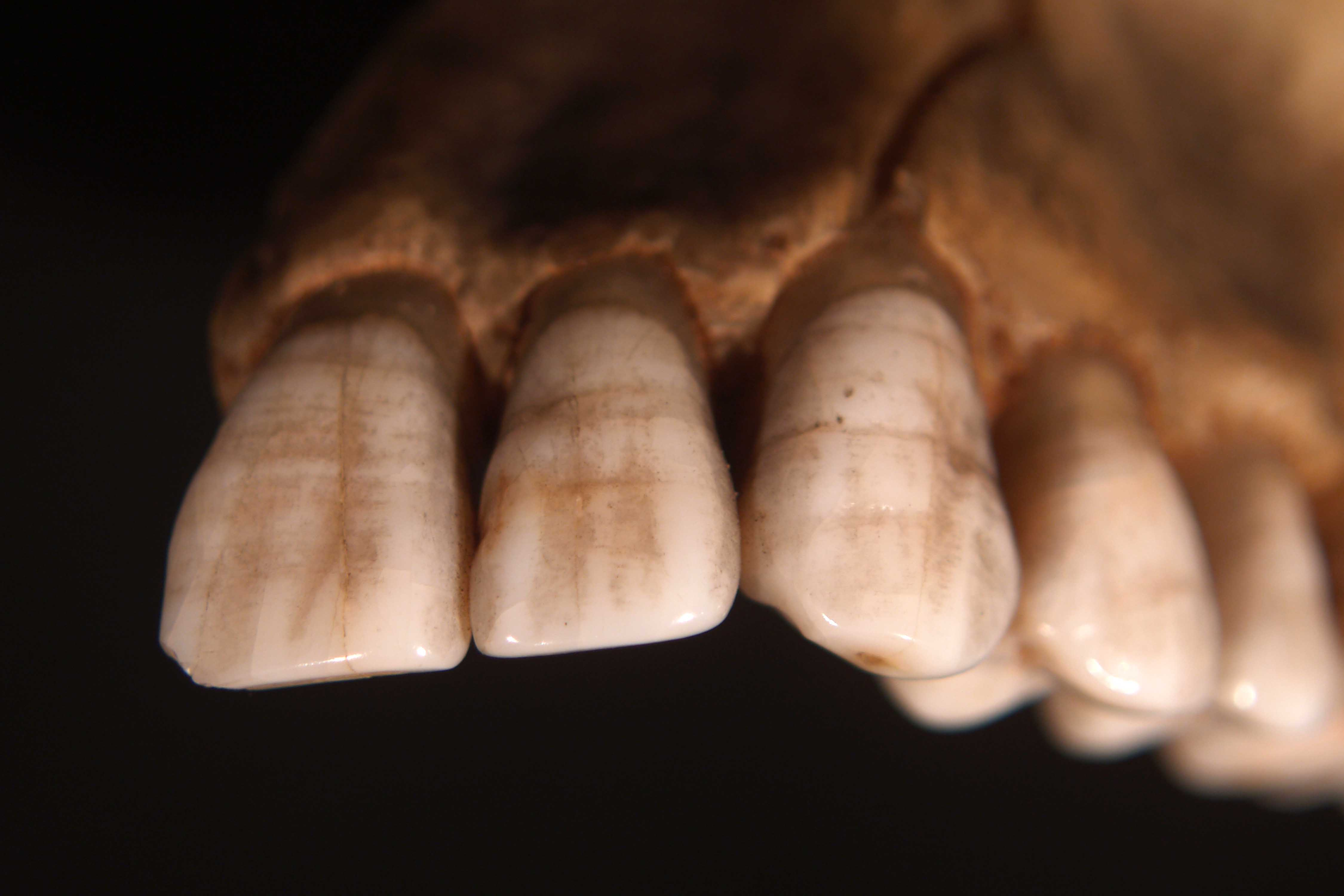
An up-close look at enamel infractions reveals pits and grooves that show how developmental defects affect tooth structure and make teeth more susceptible to decay.

Enamel infractions are microcracks in the enamel without tooth structure loss that are usually asymptomatic (Patnana & Kanchan, 2023b). Fine cracks are present on the enamel surface, which are often only visible when illuminated with a dental light using transillumination (Patnana & Kanchan, 2023b). On clinical examination, such teeth exhibit

- No sensitivity to percussion or palpation
- No involvement of periapical tissues
- Normal mobility
- Pulp sensibility tests usually positive
- X-ray are unremarkable
- Often only detectable through transillumination

(Bourguignon et al., 2020)

== Cause and mechanism ==
Enamel Infractions are described by the quality and quantity of enamel present throughout childhood. Various factors are involved in the development of infractions, some of these factors are nutritional, environmental, genetic, and systemic factors. Structural abnormalities stem from genetic mutations that change the normal proteins necessary for enamel formation but due to a lack of essential nutrients like calcium, vitamin D, and vitamin A contribute to these genetic factors. This lack of vitamins slows down the formation and mineralization of enamel during crucial stages of enamel development in early childhood. Environmental factors that also play a role are an excess of fluoride exposure during enamel development (which can cause fluorosis).

The primary cause of enamel wear in the grooves is the direct mechanical forces applied during chewing, such as vertical pressure and lateral forces as teeth grind or shear food. Particularly in areas where food is more frequently trapped or where contact is poor, the continuous friction between the food and the tooth surface causes abrasion, which slowly destroys the enamel in the grooves. Repeated mastication can cause fatigue damage to the enamel. As individuals age, the enamel on molars may naturally thin, making it more prone to damage during mastication.

Ameloblasts (the cells responsible for the production of enamel) do not function properly due to other factors like infections, trauma, or severe illness that occur similarly in the development of the enamel. All these factors combined in early childhood can reduce ameloblast activity which can result in insufficient enamel matrix protein secretion. As a result, the organic matrix could not be correctly formed or mineralized with hydroxyapatite crystals that leads to poor mineralization of the enamel. This can lead to a weakened enamel surface that is more porous, thinner, prone to pits and grooves which raises the risk of dental caries and sensitivity.

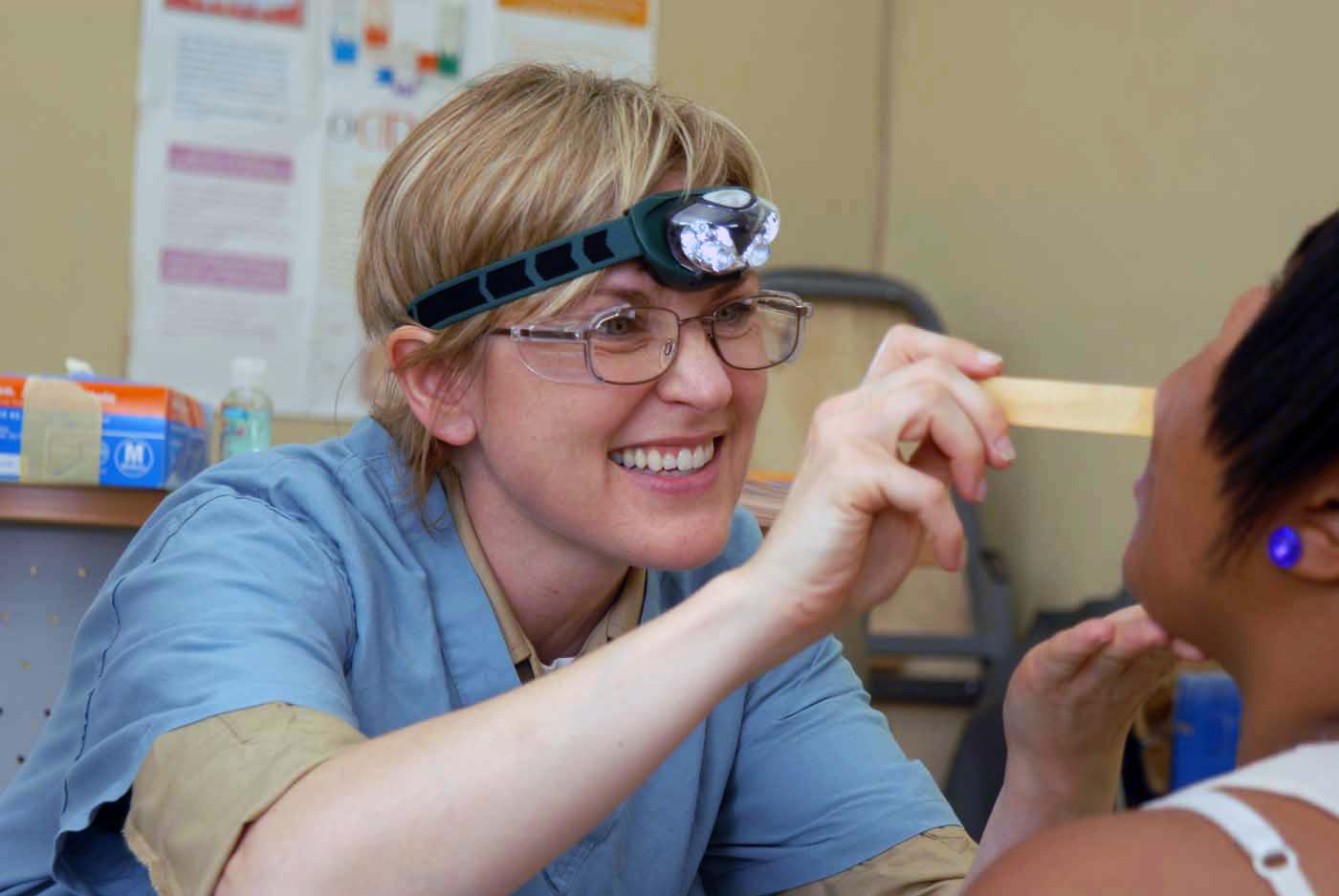
An oral examination is being held and can be observed through the image.

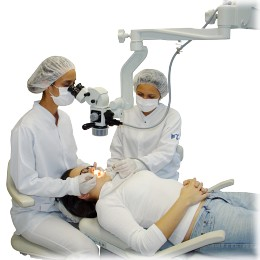
Up above is the dental operating microscope where enamel infractions can be observed.

The transilluminator is the device she is working on used to observe enamel infractions.

== Diagnostic evaluation ==
=== Clinical Examination ===
==== Transillumination ====
Transillumination involves using fiber-optic light to illuminate the tooth surface, with light diffraction at the site of an infraction, aiding in detection (Hansen et al., 2017).

==== Dye Examination ====
Dye application using agents such as methylene blue and Gentian Violet can enhance the visibility of cracks (Yu et al., 2022).

==== Bite Test ====
Patient bites on a cotton roll or Tooth Slooth. Sharp pain upon biting or releasing pressure indicates potential infractions, particularly in posterior teeth (Krell & Caplan, 2016).

==== Percussion ====
A percussion test using a blunt instrument assesses pain response. While enamel infractions usually do not elicit pain, an associated pulpal response may indicate deeper structural involvement (Rosenberg et al., 2018)

==== Vitality Test ====
Enamel infractions alone do not compromise pulp vitality, but testing is necessary to assess pulpal health.

1. Cold Test
2. EPT

==== Periodontal Probing ====
Deep, isolated probing defects may indicate vertical fractures extending beyond the enamel. This method helps assess the extent of an infraction (Ricucci et al., 2015).

==== Microscope Detection ====
Clinical microscopes, particularly at magnifications between ×14 and ×18, significantly enhance the detection of enamel cracks. (Mathew S et al.,2012)

=== Radiographic Examination ===
==== Periapical Radiograph ====
Radiographs can aid in evaluating the pulpal and periodontal health of a tooth, but it is rare to see a crack on a radiograph.

== Treatment ==
- Minor infractions may not require any treatment, however, major infractions may need treatment including smoothing, fluoride treatment, and crown restoration.
- For larger or more severe infractions, a dentist may etch the enamel surface and seal the crack with a bonding resin to prevent discoloration and bacterial contamination. (Patnana & Kanchan, 2023)
- A low-viscosity resin infiltrant, like Icon, can be used to mask unesthetic developmental defects of enamel in anterior teeth and eliminate tooth sensitivity associated with enamel infractions. (Massé & Garot, 2023)
- Even uncomplicated patients who show no strong effects can be recommended to undergo a crown restoration to be preventive and frequently x-rayed to stay updated on the condition of the tooth. For older patients, it is suggested to only do a crown restoration if there is no infection present. Older patients are more impacted in eating and daily life by the loss of their teeth so dentists try to minimize this by placing a crown.

== Complications ==
If an enamel infraction is left untreated, it can lead to a range of serious dental complications, with one of the most concerning being its progression into a full tooth fracture.

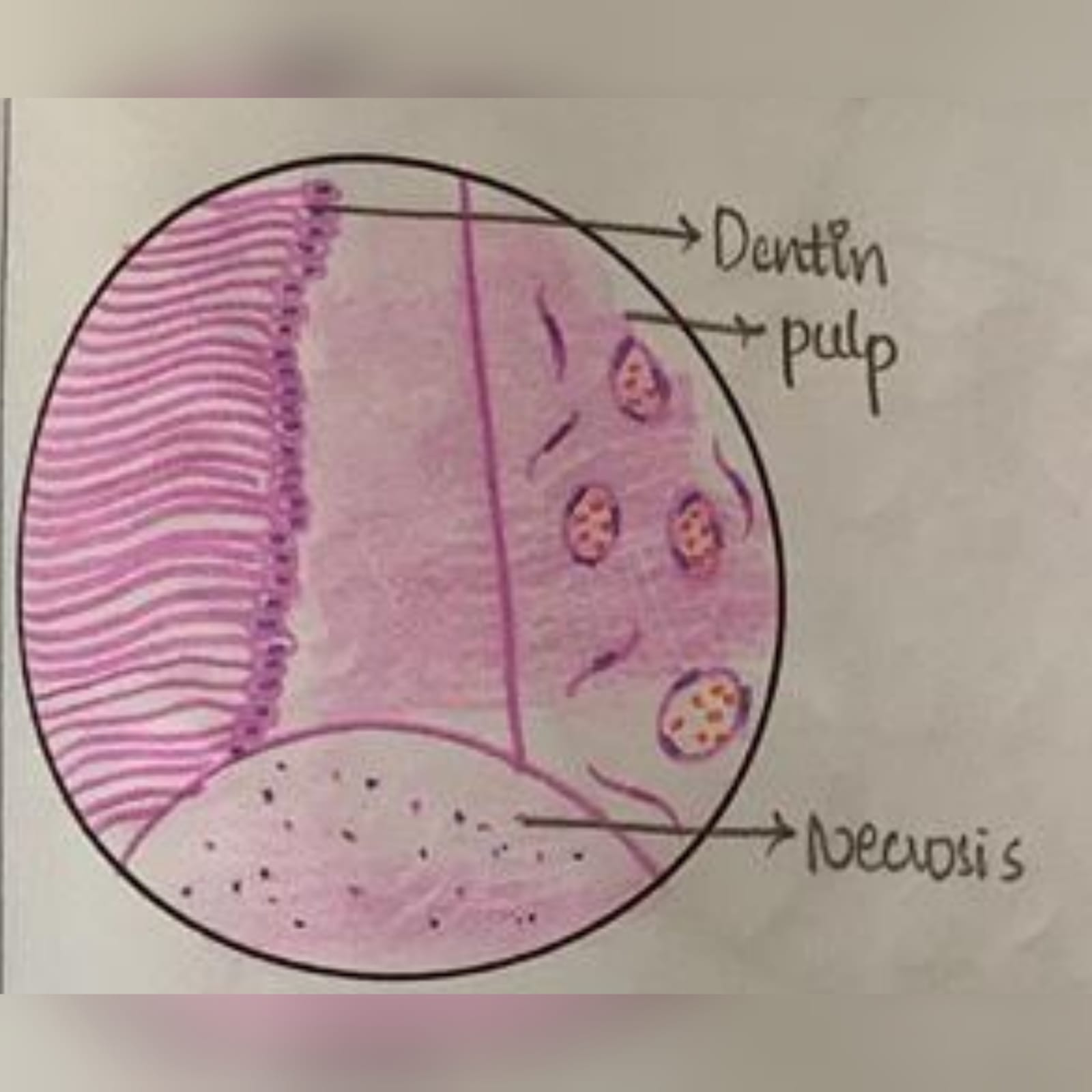
Pulp necrosis

A cracked tooth is more than just a structural defect. It can impact oral health and lead to various long-term issues. As the crack deepens and extends beyond the enamel into the underlying dentin, the tooth becomes increasingly vulnerable to further damage. If the fracture reaches the pulp, the nerves and blood vessels can cause intense pain, inflammation, and infection, which requires urgent dental intervention.

Tooth fractures resulting from untreated enamel infractions can lead to several complications. Pulp necrosis, or the death of the pulp tissue, is a common consequence, often requiring root canal treatment to remove the dead tissue and prevent infection from spreading. Crown discoloration can also occur due to disrupted blood supply within the pulp, leading to a darkened or grayish appearance of the affected tooth. (Patnana & Kanchan, 2023)

== Prognosis ==
Enamel infractions do not usually go beyond the enamel so they do not require any treatment because they do not cause any infections. Any treatment necessary is mostly for patients with concerns on the appearance of the tooth. If they want to and are able to, they can get a crown or veneers. Most patients can continue normally with enamel infractions as long as the infraction does not get bigger or cause any complications.

== Research direction ==
Infiltrant resin application is a promising minimally invasive technique for superficial enamel cracks that can improve functionality and appearance. The two case studies illustrate the method's conservative nature and present a viable option for patients with enamel infractions who would prefer not to undergo more invasive procedures. In another article, it emphasizes how the detection of enamel cracks has greatly improved due to recent technological advancements like transillumination, OCT, and AI. In an article focused on the advancements of AI allows especially for the diagnosis, localization, classification, estimate, and evaluation of oral disease in the field of dentistry. Given how quickly AI technology has developed recently, it can allow early detection or signs of these enamel infractions and help create a treatment plan. Effective treatment and the avoidance of more serious damage depend on an early and precise diagnosis. As these technologies advance, they might provide more accurate, non-invasive, and economical methods of detecting enamel cracks, improving dental care outcomes.
