= Root canal treatment =

Procedure to disinfect and fortify the interior of a tooth

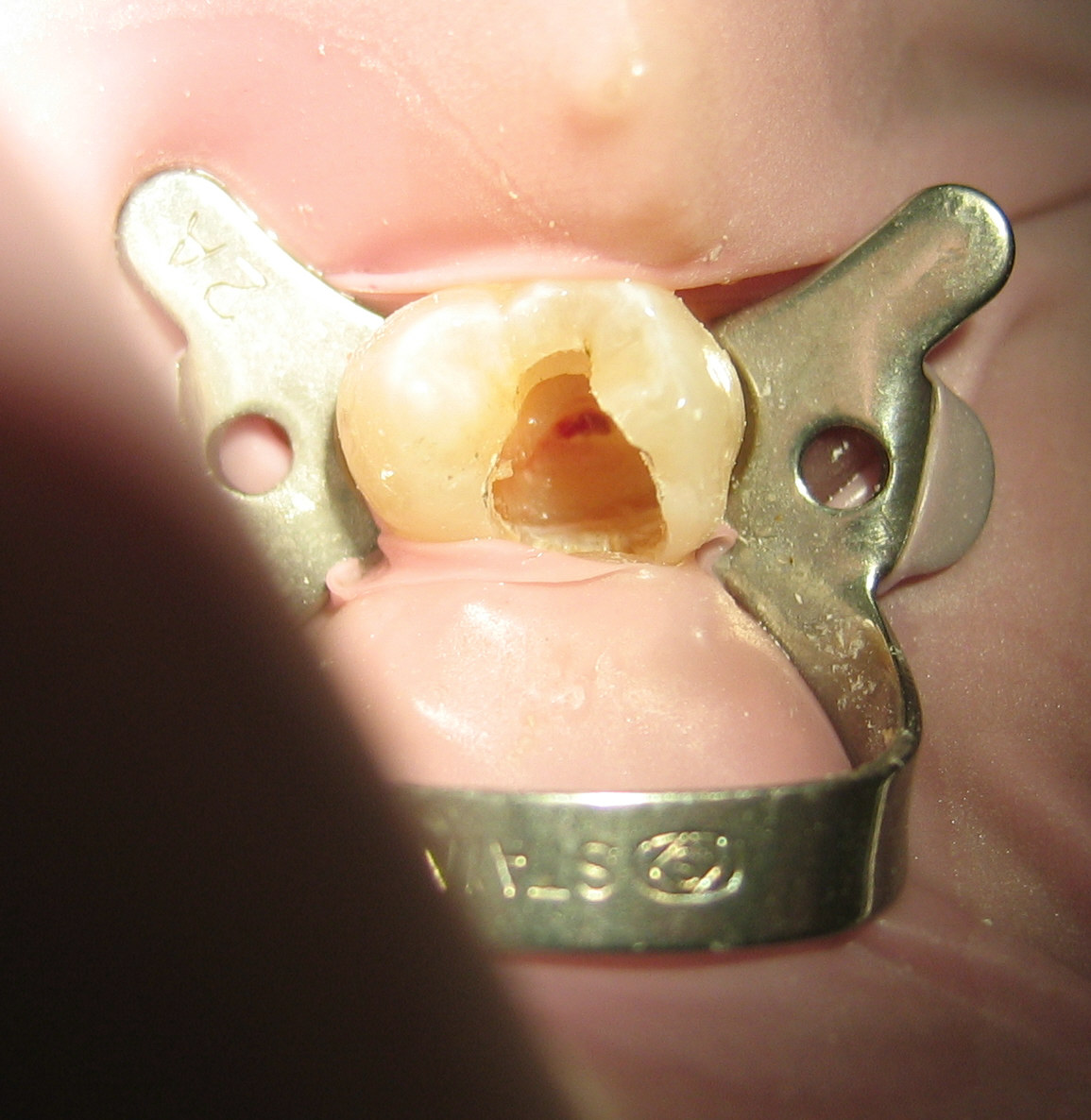
- Tooth #13 (Universal Numbering System), the left maxillary second premolar, after excavation of disto-occlusal decay. There was a carious exposure into the pulp chamber (red oval), and the photo was taken after endodontic access was initiated and the roof of the chamber was removed.
- Specialty: Endodontics

Root canal procedure: unhealthy or injured tooth, subsequent creation of an access cavity with a dental handpiece, cleaning and shaping the root canals with an endodontic file, and restoration with gutta-percha filling and a crown

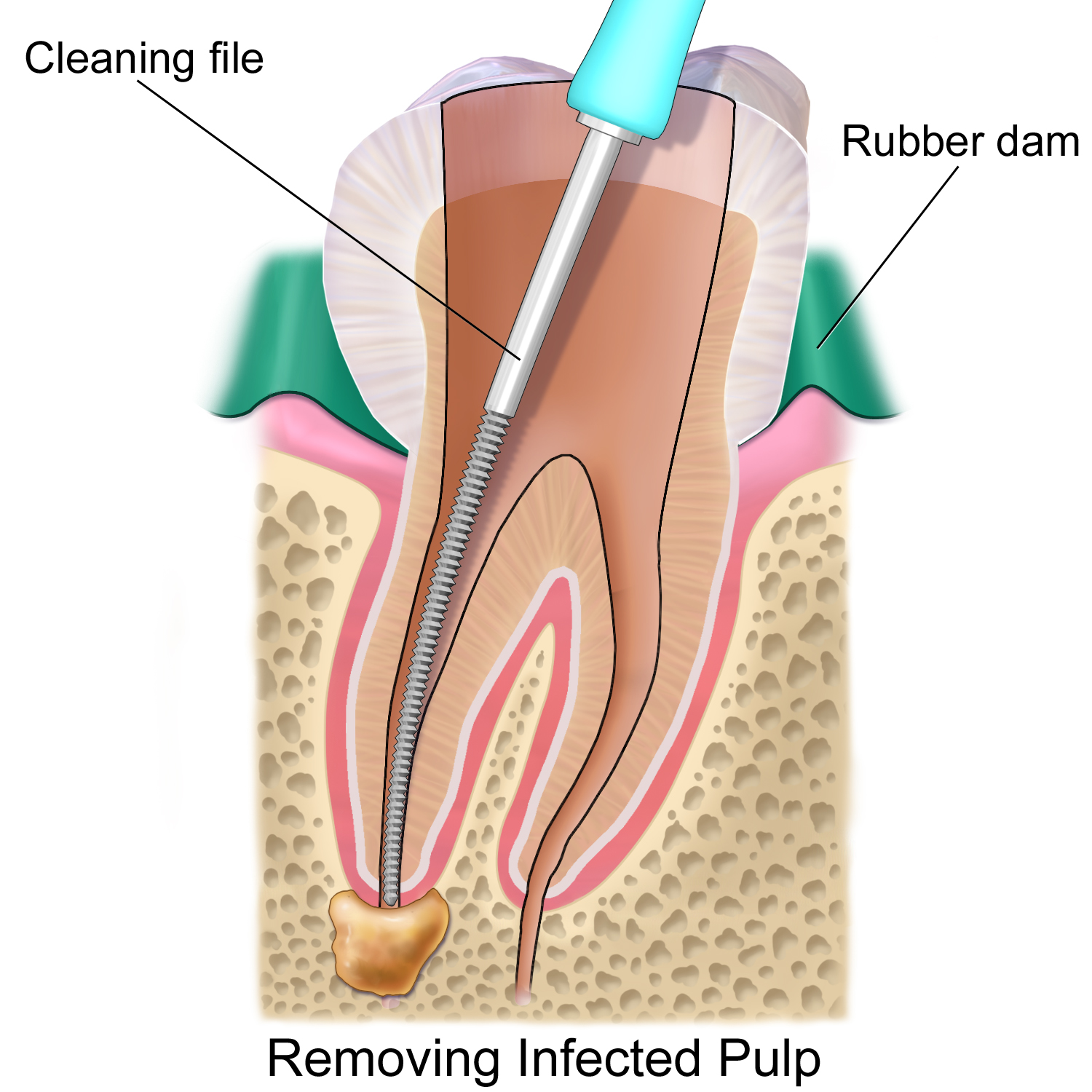
Removing infected pulp during a root canal procedure

Root canal treatment (also known as endodontic therapy, endodontic treatment, or root canal therapy) is a treatment sequence for the infected pulp of a tooth—an abscess—that is intended to result in the elimination of infection and the protection of the decontaminated tooth from future microbial invasion. It is generally done when the cavity is too big for a normal filling. Root canals, and their associated pulp chamber, are the physical hollows within a tooth that are naturally inhabited by nerve tissue, blood vessels and other cellular entities.

Endodontic therapy involves the removal of these structures, disinfection and the subsequent shaping, cleaning, and decontamination of the hollows with small files and irrigating solutions, and the obturation (filling) of the decontaminated canals. Filling of the cleaned and decontaminated canals is done with an inert filling such as gutta-percha and typically a zinc oxide eugenol-based cement. Epoxy resin is employed to bind gutta-percha in some root canal procedures. In the past, in the discredited Sargenti method, an antiseptic filling material containing paraformaldehyde like N2 was used. Endodontics includes both primary and secondary endodontic treatments as well as periradicular surgery which is generally used for teeth that still have potential for salvage.

== Treatment procedure ==
The procedure is often complicated and may involve multiple visits over a period of weeks.

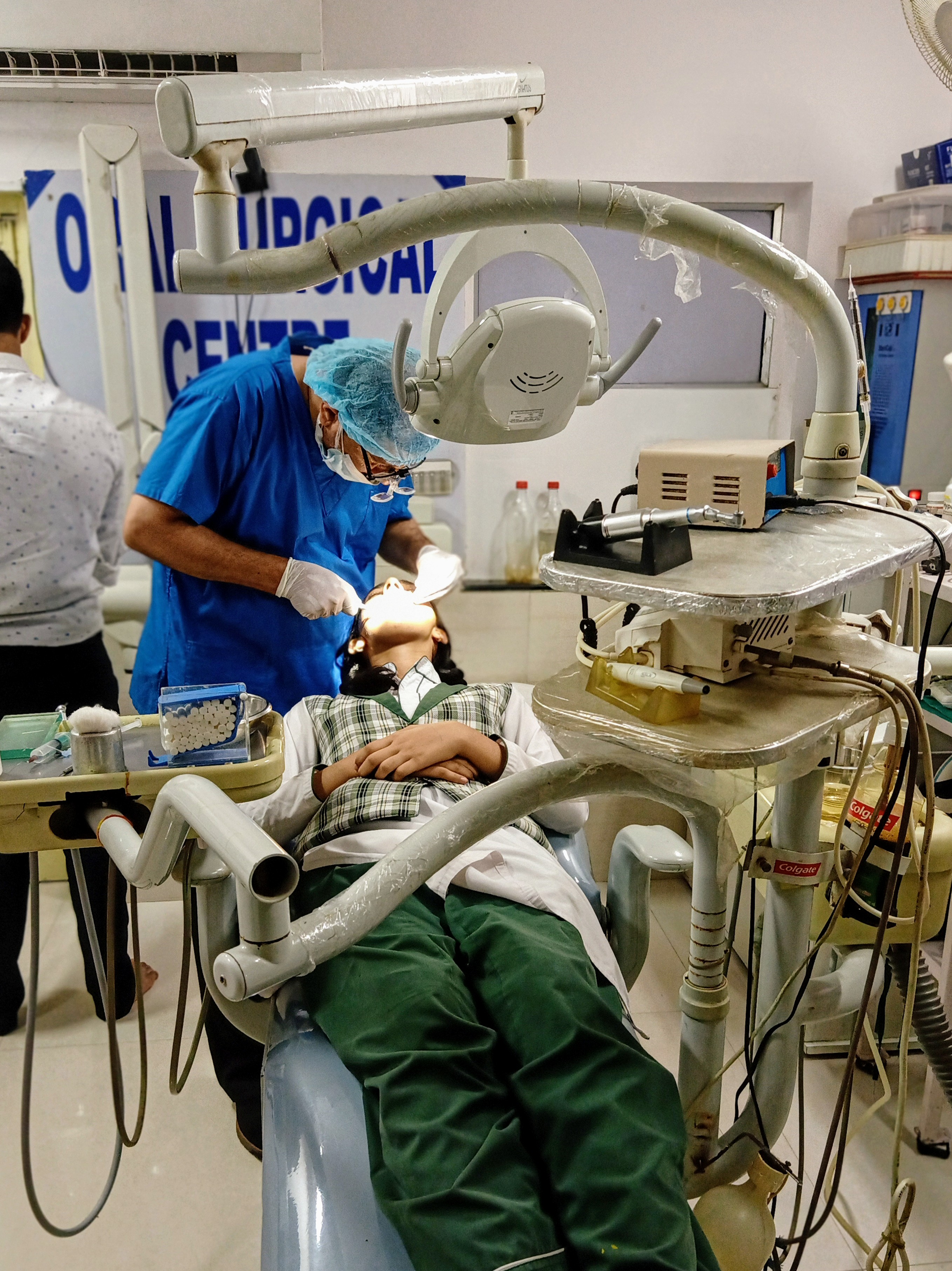
Dentist performing root canal treatment process

=== Diagnosis and preparation ===
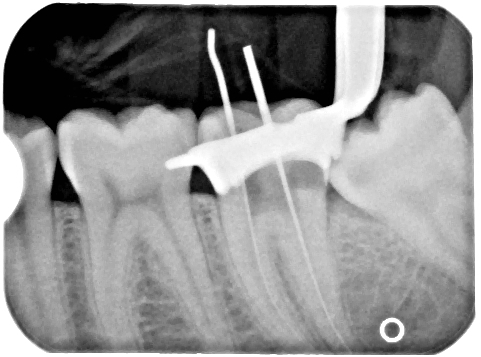
An x-ray of a root canal operation

Before endodontic therapy is carried out, a correct diagnosis of the dental pulp and the surrounding periapical tissues is required. This allows the endodontist to choose the most appropriate treatment option, allowing preservation and longevity of the tooth and surrounding tissues. Treatment options for an irreversibly inflamed pulp (irreversible pulpitis) include either extraction of the tooth or removal of the pulp. Partial pulp amputation (pulpotomy) is the treatment of choice to preserve the pulp in teeth with open apical foramen.

Removing the infected/inflamed pulpal tissue enables the endodontist to preserve the longevity and function of the tooth. The treatment option chosen involves taking into account the expected prognosis of the tooth, as well as the patient's wishes. A full history is required, along with a clinical examination (both inside and outside the mouth), and the use of diagnostic tests.

There are several tests that can aid in the diagnosis of the dental pulp and the surrounding tissues:

- Palpation (this is where the tip of the root is felt from the overlying tissues to see if there is any swelling or tenderness present)
- Mobility (this is assessing if there is more than normal movement of the tooth in the socket)
- Percussion (TTP, tender to percussion; the tooth is tapped to see if there is any tenderness)
- Transillumination (shining a light through the tooth to see if there are any noticeable fractures)
- Tooth Slooth (this is where the patient is asked to bite down upon a plastic instrument; useful if the patient complains of pain on biting as this can be used to localise the tooth)
- Radiographs
- Dental pulp tests

If a tooth is so compromised (because of decay, cracking, etc.) that future infection is considered very likely or inevitable, a pulpectomy (removal of the pulp tissue) is advisable to prevent such infection. Usually, some inflammation and/or infection is already present within and/or below the tooth. To cure the infection and save the tooth, the dentist drills into the pulp chamber and removes the infected pulp. To eliminate bacteria from the pulp chamber and root canals, the use of efficient antiseptics and disinfectants is necessary. The soft tissues are either drilled out of the root canal(s) with engine driven rotary files, or with long needle-shaped hand files.

=== Opening the crown ===
The endodontist makes an opening through the enamel and dentin tissues of the tooth, usually using a dental drill fitted with a dental burr.

Isolating the tooth

The use of a rubber dam for tooth isolation is mandatory in endodontic treatment for several reasons:

1. It provides an aseptic operating field, isolating the tooth from oral and salivary contamination. Root canal contamination with saliva introduces new microorganisms to the root canal which compromise the prognosis.
2. It facilitates the use of the strong medicaments necessary to clean the root canal system.
3. It protects the patient from the inhalation or ingestion of endodontic instruments.

=== Removal of pulp tissue ===
There have been a number of progressive iterations to the mechanical preparation of the root canal for endodontic therapy. The first, referred to as the standardized technique, was developed by Ingle in 1961, and had disadvantages such as the potential for loss of working length and inadvertent ledging, zipping or perforation. Subsequent refinements have been numerous, and are usually described as techniques. These include the step-back, circumferential filing, incremental, anticurvature filing, step-down, double flare, crown-down-pressureless, balanced force, canal master, apical box, progressive enlargement, modified double flare, passive stepback, alternated rotary motions, and apical patency techniques.

The step back technique, also known as telescopic or serial root canal preparation, is divided in two phases: in the first, the working length is established and then the apical part of the canal is delicately shaped since a size 25 K-file reaches the working length; in the second, the remaining canal is prepared with manual or rotating instrumentation. This procedure, however, has some disadvantages, such as the potential for inadvertent apical transportation. Incorrect instrumentation length can occur, which can be addressed by the modified step back. Obstructing debris can be dealt with by the passive step back technique. The crown down is a procedure in which the dentist prepares the canal beginning from the coronal part after exploring the patency of the whole canal with the master apical file.

There is a hybrid procedure combining step back and crown down: after the canal's patency check, the coronal third is prepared with hand or Gates Glidden drills, then the working length is determined and finally the apical portion is shaped using step back techniques. The double flare is a procedure introduced by Fava where the canal is explored using a small file. The canal is prepared in crown down manner using K-files then follows a "step back" preparation with 1 mm increments with increasing file sizes. With early coronal enlargement, also described as "three times technique", apical canals are prepared after a working length assessment using an apex locator; then progressively enlarged with Gates Glidden drills (only coronal and middle third). For the eponymic third time the dentist "arrives at the apex" and, if necessary, prepares the foramen with a size 25 K-file; the last phase is divided in two refining passages: the first with a 1-mm staggered instrument, the second with 0.5-mm staggering. From the early nineties engine-driven instrumentation were gradually introduced including the ProFile system, the Greater Taper files, the ProTaper files, and other systems like Light Speed, Quantec, K-3 rotary, Real World Endo, and the Hero 642.

All of these procedures involve frequent irrigation and recapitulation with the master apical file, a small file that reaches the apical foramen. High frequency ultrasound based techniques have also been described. These can be useful in particular for cases with complex anatomy, or for retained foreign body retrieval from a failed prior endodontic procedure.

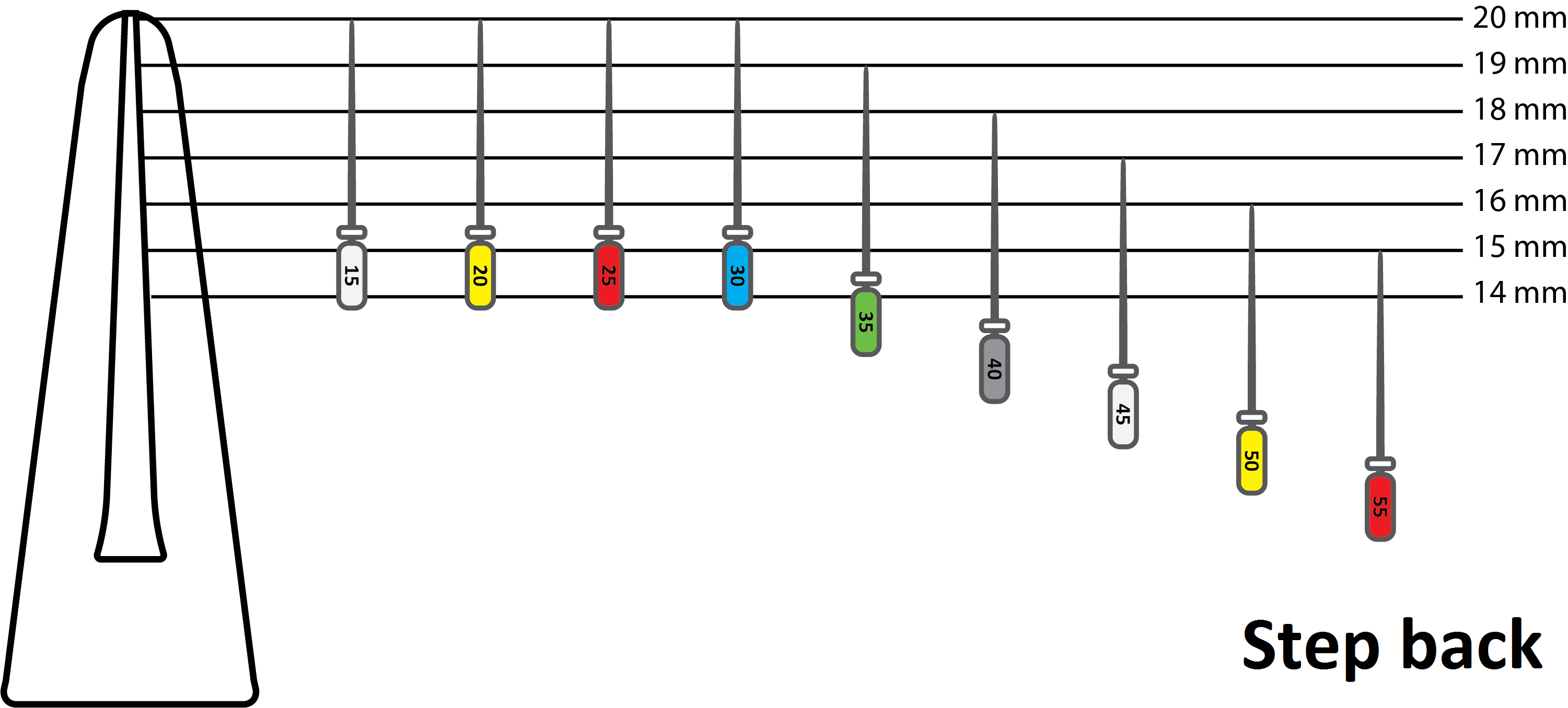
An example of step back technique

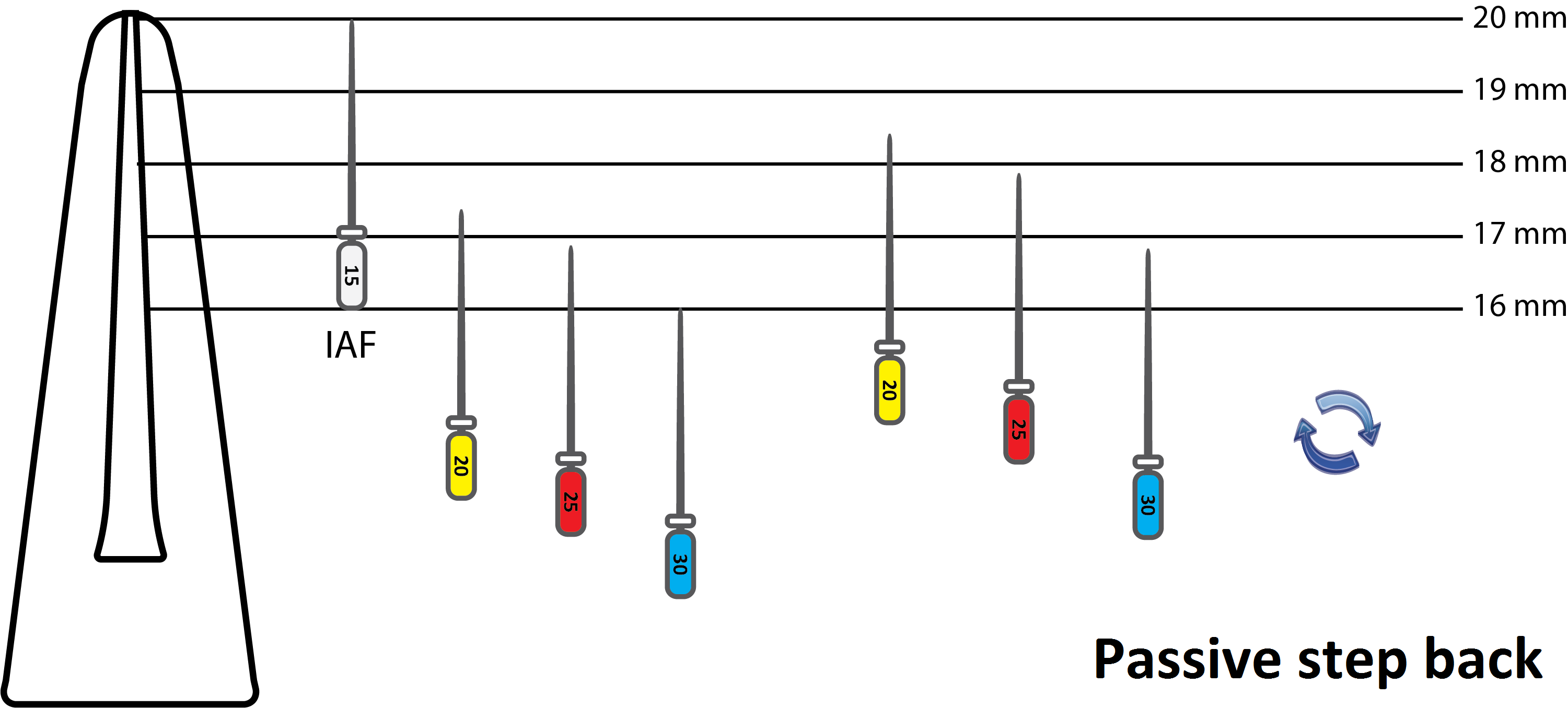
An example of passive step back technique

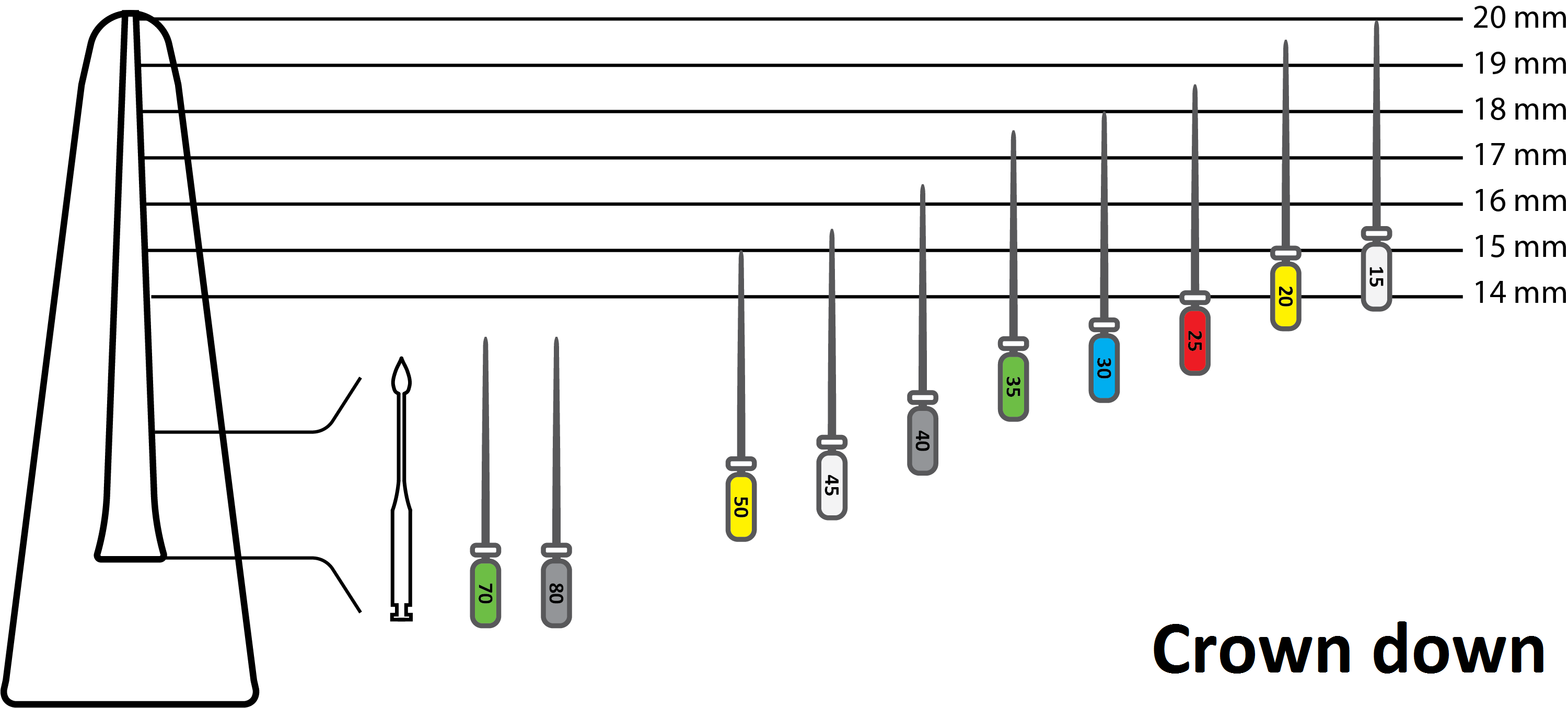
An example of crown down technique

There are two slightly different anti-curvature techniques. In the balanced forces technique, the dentist inserts a file into the canal and rotates clockwise a quarter of a turn, engaging dentin, then rotates counter-clockwise half/ three-quarter of a revolution, applying pressure in an apical direction, shearing off tissue previously meshed. From the balanced forces stem two other techniques: the reverse balanced force (where GT instruments are rotated first anti-clockwise and then clockwise) and the gentler "feed and pull" where the instrument is rotated only a quarter of a revolution and moved coronally after an engagement, but not drawn out.

=== Use of anesthetics ===
Since 2000, lidocaine is the most commonly used local anesthetic for root canal therapy.

=== Irrigation ===
The root canal is flushed with an irrigant. Some common ones are listed below:

- Sodium hypochlorite (NaClO) in concentrations ranging between 0.5% and 5.25%
- 6% sodium hypochlorite with surface modifiers for better flow into nooks and crannies
- 2% chlorhexidine gluconate
- 0.2% chlorhexidine gluconate plus 0.2% cetrimonium chloride
- 17% ethylenediaminetetraacetic acid (EDTA)
- Framycetin sulfate
- Mixture of citric acid, doxycycline, and polysorbate 80 (detergent) (MTAD)
- Saline
- Near anhydrous ethanol

The primary aim of chemical irrigation is to kill microbes and dissolve pulpal tissue. Certain irrigants, such as sodium hypochlorite and chlorhexidine, have proved to be effective antimicrobials in vitro and are widely used during root canal therapy worldwide. According to a systematic review, however, there is a lack of good quality evidence to support the use of one irrigant over another in terms of both short and long term prognosis of therapy.

Root canal irrigation systems are divided into two categories: manual agitation techniques and machine-assisted agitation techniques. Manual irrigation includes positive-pressure irrigation, which is commonly performed with a syringe and a side vented needle. Machine-assisted irrigation techniques include sonics and ultrasonics, as well as newer systems which deliver apical negative-pressure irrigation.

=== Filling the root canal ===
The standard filling material is gutta-percha, a natural polymer prepared from latex from the percha tree (Palaquium gutta). The standard endodontic technique involves inserting a gutta-percha cone (a "point") into the cleaned-out root canal along with a sealing cement. Another technique uses melted or heat-softened gutta-percha which is then injected or pressed into the root canal passage(s). However, since gutta-percha shrinks as it cools, thermal techniques can be unreliable and sometimes a combination of techniques is used. Gutta-percha is radiopaque, allowing verification afterwards that the root canal passages have been completely filled and are without voids.

Pain control can be difficult to achieve at times because of anesthetic inactivation by the acidity of the abscess around the tooth apex. Sometimes the abscess can be drained, antibiotics prescribed, and the procedure reattempted when inflammation has been mitigated. The tooth can also be unroofed to allow drainage and help relieve pressure.

A root treated tooth may be eased from the occlusion as a measure to prevent tooth fracture prior to the cementation of a crown or similar restoration. Sometimes the dentist performs preliminary treatment of the tooth by removing all of the infected pulp of the tooth and applying a dressing and temporary filling to the tooth. This is called a pulpectomy. The dentist may also remove just the coronal portion of the dental pulp, which contains 90% of the nerve tissue, and leave intact the pulp in the canals. This procedure, called a "pulpotomy", tends to essentially eliminate all the pain. A pulpotomy may be a relatively definitive treatment for infected primary teeth. The pulpectomy and pulpotomy procedures aim to eliminate pain until the follow-up visit for finishing the root canal procedure. Further occurrences of pain could indicate the presence of continuing infection or retention of vital nerve tissue.

Some dentists may decide to temporarily fill the canal with calcium hydroxide paste in order to thoroughly sterilize the site. This strong base is left in place for a week or more to disinfect and reduce inflammation in surrounding tissue, requiring the patient to return for a second or third visit to complete the procedure. There appears to be no benefit from this multi-visit option, however, and single-visit procedures actually show better (though not statistically significant) patient outcomes than multi-visit ones.

=== Temporary filling ===
Temporary filling-materials allow the creation of hermetic coronal-seals preventing from coronal microleakage (i.e. contamination of the root canal by bacteria); their presence over the entire time-period to fill the root canal and restore the tooth crown is mandatory, for increasing the probability of the endodontic-treatment success. However, these temporary filling-materials create coronal seals which only remain hermetic during less than 30 days in average (mainly because of the bacteria the saliva contains). Some temporary filling-materials may remain hermetic during 40–70 days. However the estimated standard-deviations of these higher average-durations are important and their computations used observations from dye-based tests, which are less reliable than saliva-based tests.

=== Final restoration ===
Molars and premolars that have had root canal therapy should be protected with a crown that covers the cusps of the tooth. This is because the access made into the root canal system removes a significant amount of tooth structure. Molars and premolars are the primary teeth used in chewing and will almost certainly fracture in the future without cuspal coverage. Anterior teeth typically do not require full coverage restorations after a root canal procedure, unless there is extensive tooth loss from decay or for esthetics or unusual occlusion. Placement of a crown or cusp-protecting cast gold covering is recommended also because these have the best ability to seal the treated tooth. There is insufficient evidence to assess the effects of crowns compared to conventional fillings for the restoration of root-filled teeth, decision of restoration should rely on the clinical experience of the practitioner and the preference of the patients. If the tooth is not perfectly sealed, the canal may leak, causing eventual failure. A tooth with a root canal treatment still has the ability to decay, and without proper home care and an adequate fluoride source the tooth structure can become severely decayed (often without the patient's knowledge since the nerve has been removed, leaving the tooth without any pain perception). Thus, non-restorable carious destruction is the main reason for extraction of teeth after root canal therapy, accounting for up to two-thirds of these extractions. Therefore, it is very important to have regular X-rays taken of the root canal to ensure that the tooth is not having any problems that the patient would not be aware of.

=== Endodontic retreatment ===
Endodontic treatment may fail for many reasons: one common reason for failure is inadequate chemomechanical debridement of the root canal. This may be due to poor endodontic access, missed anatomy or inadequate shaping of the canal, particularly in the apical third of the root canal, also due to the difficulty of reaching the accessory canals which are minute canals that extend in from the pulp to the periodontium in a random direction. They are mostly found in the apical third of the root.

Exposure of the obturation material to the oral environment may mean the gutta-percha is contaminated with oral bacteria. If complex and expensive restorative dentistry is contemplated then ideally the contaminated gutta percha would be replaced in a retreatment procedure to minimise the risk of failure.

The type of bacteria found within a failed canal may differ from the normal infected tooth. Enterococcus faecalis and/or other facultative enteric bacteria or Pseudomonas sp. are found in this situation.

Endodontic retreatment is technically demanding; it can be a time-consuming procedure, as meticulous care is required by the dentist. Retreatment cases are typically referred to a specialist endodontist. Use of an operating microscope or other magnification may improve outcomes.

Currently, there is no strong evidence favoring surgical or non-surgical retreatment of periapical lesions. However, studies have reported that patients experience more pain and swelling after surgical retreatment compared to non-surgical. When comparing surgical techniques, the use of ultrasonic devices may improve healing after retreatment. Application of nanomotor implants have been proposed to achieve thorough disinfection of the dentine. There is no evidence that the use of antibiotics after endodontic retreatment prevents post-operative infection.

=== Postoperative pain ===
Several randomized clinical trials concluded that the use of rotary instruments is associated with a lower incidence of pain following the endodontic procedure when compared to the use of manual hand instruments. Corticosteroid intra-oral injections were found to alleviate pain in the first 24 hours in patients with symptomatic irreversible pulp inflammation.

== Complications ==
=== Instrument fractures ===
Instruments may separate (break) during root canal treatment, meaning a portion of the metal file used during the procedure remains inside the tooth. The file segment may be left behind if an acceptable level of cleaning and shaping has already been completed and attempting to remove the segment would risk damage to the tooth. While potentially disconcerting to the patient, having metal inside of a tooth is relatively common, such as with metal posts, amalgam fillings, gold crowns, and porcelain fused to metal crowns. The occurrence of file separation depends on the narrowness, curvature, length, calcification and number of roots on the tooth being treated. Complications resulting from incompletely cleaned canals, due to blockage from the separated file, can be addressed with surgical root canal treatment. The risk of endodontic files fracturing can be minimised by:

- Ensuring access cavity allows straight-line introduction of files into canals
- Creating a glide path before use of larger taper NiTi files
- Using rotary instruments at the manufacturer's recommended speed and torque setting
- Adopting a single-use file policy to prevent overuse of files
- Inspecting the file thoroughly every time before inserting it inside the canal
- Using ample amounts of irrigation solutions
- Avoiding the use of rotary files in severely curved or dilacerated canals

=== Sodium hypochlorite accident ===
A sodium hypochlorite incident results in an immediate reaction of severe pain, followed by edema, haematoma and ecchymosis, as a consequence of the solution escaping the confines of the tooth and entering the periapical space. This may be caused iatrogenically by binding or excessive pressure on the irrigant syringe or it may occur if the tooth has an unusually large apical foramen. It is usually self-resolving and may take two to five weeks to fully resolve.

=== Tooth discoloration ===
Tooth discoloration is common following root canal treatment; however, the exact causes for this are not completely understood. Failure to completely clean out the necrotic soft tissue of the pulp system may cause staining, and certain root canal materials (e.g. gutta percha and root canal sealer cements) can also cause staining. Another possible factor is that the lack of pulp pressure in dentinal tubules once the pulp is removed leads to incorporation of dietary stains in dentin.

=== Poor-quality root filling ===
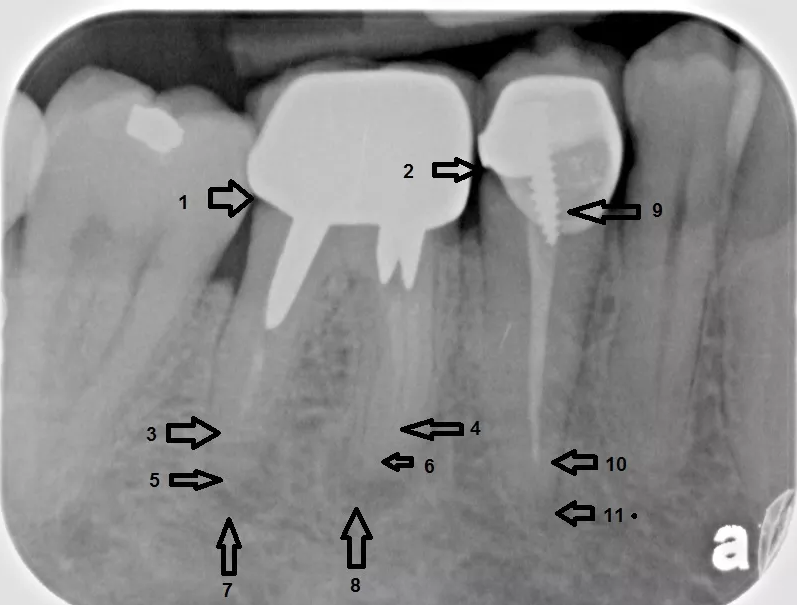
X-ray explanation of bad root canal therapy

Another common complication of root canal therapy is when the entire length of the root canal is not completely cleaned out and filled (obturated) with root canal filling material (usually gutta percha). On the other hand, the root canal filling material may be extruded from the apex leading to other complications. The X-ray in the right margin shows two adjacent teeth that had received bad root canal therapy. The root canal filling material (3, 4, and 10) does not extend to the end of the tooth roots (5, 6 and 11). The dark circles at the bottom of the tooth roots (7 and 8) indicated infection in the surrounding bone. Appropriate treatment is either to repeat the root canal therapy or extract the tooth and install dental implants. Poor quality filling material or sealant may also cause root canal treatment to fail.

=== Systemic risks ===
An infected tooth may endanger other parts of the body. People with special vulnerabilities, such as a recent prosthetic joint replacement, an unrepaired congenital heart defect, or immunocompromisation, may need to take antibiotics to protect from infection spreading during dental procedures. The American Dental Association (ADA) asserts that any risks can be adequately controlled. A properly performed root canal treatment effectively removes the infected part of the pulp from the tooth.

In the early 1900s, several researchers theorized that bacteria from teeth which had necrotic pulps or which had received endodontic treatment could cause chronic or local infection in areas distant from the tooth through the transfer of bacteria through the bloodstream. This was called the "focal infection theory", and it led some dentists to advocate dental extraction. This theory was discredited in the 1930s.

Bacteremia (bacteria in the bloodstream) can be caused by many everyday activities, e.g. brushing teeth, but may also occur after any dental procedure which involves bleeding. It is particularly likely after dental extractions due to the movement of the tooth and force needed to dislodge it, but endodontically treated teeth alone do not cause bacteremia or systemic disease.

== Outcome and prognosis ==
Root-canal-treated teeth may fail to heal—for example, if the dentist does not find, clean and fill all of the root canals within a tooth. On a maxillary molar, there is more than a 50% chance that the tooth has four canals instead of just three, but the fourth canal, often called a "mesio-buccal 2", tends to be very difficult to see and often requires special instruments and magnification in order to see it (most commonly found in first maxillary molars; studies have shown an average of 76% up to 96% of such teeth with the presence of an MB2 canal). This infected canal may cause a continued infection or "flare-up" of the tooth. Any tooth may have more canals than expected, and these canals may be missed when the root canal procedure is performed. Sometimes canals may be unusually shaped, making them impossible to clean and fill completely; some infected material may remain in the canal. Sometimes the canal filling does not fully extend to the apex of the tooth, or it does not fill the canal as densely as it should. Sometimes a tooth root may be perforated while the root canal is being treated, making it difficult to fill the tooth. The perforation may be filled with a root repair material, such as one derived from natural cement called mineral trioxide aggregate (MTA). A specialist can often re-treat failing root canals, and these teeth will then heal, often years after the initial root canal procedure.

The survival or functionality of the endodontically treated tooth is often the most important aspect of the endodontic treatment outcomes, rather than its apical healing alone. One issue was about the commonly used sanitising substances which incompletely sanitised the root-canal space. A properly restored tooth following root canal therapy yields long-term success rates near 97%. In a large-scale study of over 1.6 million patients who had root canal therapy, 97% had retained their teeth 8 years following the procedure, with most untoward events, such as re-treatment, apical surgery or extraction, occurring during the first 3 years after the initial endodontic treatment. Endodontically treated teeth are prone to extraction mainly due to non-restorable carious destruction, other times due to the improper fit of the crown margins that encircles the tooth which lead to the ingress of bacteria, and to a lesser extent to endodontic-related reasons such as endodontic failure, vertical root fracture, or perforation (procedural error).

== Maintaining tooth function after pulp removal ==
After removal of the pulp, a mature tooth can retain its function, even though the blood vessels and nerves from the root canals have been removed. Upon completion of tooth development, its nourishment is maintained by the tissues around the root, even if the pulp has been removed. These tissues are part of the Periodontium, which provides support for the tooth. To preserve function long-term after treatment, the canals are filled and the coronal portion is restored.

== Current research ==
Newer technologies such as cone-beam CT scanning may allow more accurate measurements to be taken of the dimensions of the root canal, however, the use of CT scanning in endodontics has yet to be justified.

Many dentists use dental loupes to perform root canal therapy, and the consensus is that procedures performed using loupes or other forms of magnification (e.g. a surgical microscope) are more likely to succeed than those performed without them. Although general dentists are becoming versed in these advanced technologies, they are still more likely to be used by endodontists.

Laser root canal procedures are a controversial innovation, as they may offer faster treatment but have not been shown to thoroughly disinfect the whole tooth, and may cause damage to the tooth.

== Alternative treatments ==
Nondisruption of the periodontal fiber is a benefit of endodontic over implant therapy (labeled I–K)

The alternatives to root canal therapy include no treatment or tooth extraction. Following tooth extraction, options for prosthetic replacement may include dental implants, a fixed partial denture (commonly referred to as a 'bridge'), or a removable denture. There are risks to forgoing treatment, including pain, infection and the possibility of worsening dental infection such that the tooth will become irreparable (root canal treatment will not be successful, often caused by excessive loss of tooth structure). If extensive loss of tooth structure occurs, extraction may be the only option.

Research comparing endodontic therapy with implant therapy is considerable, both as an initial treatment and in retreatment for failed initial endodontic approaches. Endodontic therapy allows avoidance of disruption of the periodontal fiber, which helps with proprioception for occlusal feedback, a reflex important in preventing patients from chewing improperly and damaging the temporomandibular joint. In a comparison of initial nonsurgical endodontic treatment and single-tooth implants, both were found to have similar success rates. While the procedures are similar in terms of pain and discomfort, a notable difference is that patients who have implants have reported "the worst pain of their life" during the extraction, with the implantation itself being relatively painless. The worst pain of endodontic therapy was reported with the initial anesthetic injection. Some patients receiving implants also describe a dull nagging pain after the procedure, while those with endodontic therapy describe "sensation" or "sensitivity" in the area. Other studies have found that endodontic therapy patients report the maximum pain the day following treatment, while extraction and implantation patients reported maximum pain the end of the week after the operation.

Implants also take longer, with a typically 3- to 6-month gap between the tooth implantation and receiving the crown, depending on the severity of infection. With regard to gender, women tend to report higher psychological disability after endodontic therapy, and a higher rate of physical disability after tooth implantation, while men do not show a statistically significant difference in response. Mastication is significantly stronger in endodontically treated teeth as compared to implants. Initial success rates after single tooth implants and endodontic microsurgery are similar the first 2 to 4 years following surgery, though after this the success rate of endodontic microsurgery is decreased as compared to implantation.

To an extent, the criteria for success due to the inherent differences in the procedure have historically limited comparisons, with success of endodontic therapy defined as the absence of periapical lucency on radiographs, or the absence of visible cavity at the root of the tooth on imaging. Implant success, on the other hand, is defined by osseointegration, or fusion of the implant to the adjacent maxilla or mandible. Endodontically treated teeth have significantly less requirement for follow up treatment after final restoration, while implants need more appointments to finish treatment and more maintenance.

== See also ==
- Dental implant – Surgical component that interfaces with the bone of the jaw
- Regenerative endodontics – Dental specialty
- Tooth extraction – Operation to remove a tooth
