= Root apex =

Root apex may refer to:

- Root apex (botany), the tip of the root where the growth happens
- Root apex (dental), the tip of the root of a tooth
