= Endodontic files and reamers =

Surgical instruments used in root canal treatments

Endodontic files and reamers are surgical instruments used by dentists when performing root canal treatment. These tools are used to clean and shape the root canal, with the concept being to perform complete chemomechanical debridement of the root canal to the length of the apical foramen. Preparing the canal in this way facilitates the chemical disinfection to a satisfactory length but also provides a shape conducive to obturation (filling of the canal).

== Hand files ==
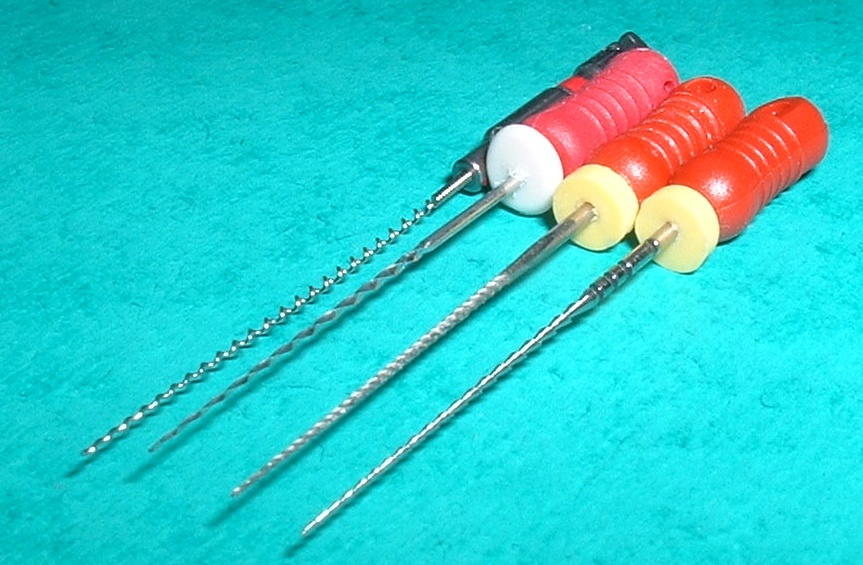
Miscellaneous endodontic instruments. From left: Lentulo spiral, reamer, K-file and H-file.

Hand files can provide tactile sensation when cleaning or shaping root canals. This allows the dentist to feel changes in resistance or angulation, which can help determine curvature, calcification and/or changes in anatomy, which two dimensional radiographs may not always identify. This information can help determine strategies or avoid complications before moving on to rotary instruments.

=== K-type files ===
The cutting edge of K type files is made up of twisted squares of stainless steel alloy. The K-flex file differs for the fact it has a rhomboid shaped cross-section and has an increased flexibility compared to traditional K-files.

=== C-type files ===
C-files are stiffer than K-files, and are recommended for calcified canals and ones that are curved and narrow.

=== Nickel-titanium files ===
Nickel-titanium is a superelastic alloy which allows it to undergo greater stresses compared to stainless steel therefore files have a reduced risk of file fracture. It also has the characteristic of 'shape memory' which allows it to return to its initial shape through heating after strain. This reduces the risk of deformation within the root canal as forces of compression and tension are absent.

The superelasticity allows an increase in taper (between 4–8%) compared to stainless steel. This allows an adequate taper of the root canal which takes less time to prepare than with stainless steel and less files needed. The super elasticity also means the risk of zipping and apical transportation is reduced.

Many Nickel-titanium files are available. The files can be used within rotary systems or manually for a higher level of control.

==== Techniques for use ====
Watch winding and circumferential filing technique

The use of the file in a forwards and backwards motion, as if watch winding, with slight apical pressure. This allows the file to effectively debride the canal dentine by moving slowly down the canal.

For K-type files, once the file has reached the desired working length, a push and pulling action is used around the circumference of the canal, while only maintaining contact with the canal wall on the outstroke to minimise a debris blockage apically.

The balanced force technique

This is the most widely used technique and especially good for working with curved canals.

Files used for this technique need to be non-cutting edge and flexible. The file is rotated 60 degrees clockwise in the canal when a slight resistance is felt. The file is then rotated 360 degrees anticlockwise to pick up the dentine in the flutes that was made during the first rotation. This should be done no more than three times before the file is removed and cleaned and the canal system irrigated before reinsertion.

=== Hedstrom files ===
The cross-section of a Hedstrom file (H-file) is made up of a continuous sequence of cones. They are very sharp with a cutting tip. Their use in a push-pull fashion results in a high level of debridement on removal from the root canal. They should not be rotated more than 30 degrees as they are narrow and vulnerable to fracture. They are also used for removal of root canal filling materials e.g. gutta percha during secondary root canal treatment.

=== Barbed broach ===
This file is used to remove pulp tissue (extirpation) during root canal treatment. There are sharp barbs on the file to engage the pulp tissue and remove this efficiently. These files are not used to shape the RCS.

== Standardisation of instruments (ISO) ==
The handles of the ISO instruments are colour coded and are available in three different lengths of 21mm, 25mm and 31mm where the extra length is non-cutting shaft. This extra length is particularly useful for posterior teeth where access and visibility is impaired.

ISO files are made of stainless steel. This can be useful in smaller files (<20) but larger files have increased rigidity which can result in procedural errors. At smaller sizes the files can be pre-curved which is a major advantage for the debridement of roots with sharp curvatures. Their rigidity also has an advantage in calcified root canals in the initial stages of debridement.

The ISO stainless steel files on the market today include K-Flex, K-Flexofile and Hedström where the tip size and taper is standardised.

ISO normed hand files have a standardised taper of 2% that equates to 0.02mm increase in diameter per mm of file. This standardised taper allows you to calculate the diameter of any given stainless steel file at any given point. Where the 2% taper means that there is an increase in diameter by 0.02mm every 1mm of file (moved in a coronal direction). The most apical point of any file is deemed D_{0}, so moving coronal on the file by 1mm brings you to D_{1} and so on, up to D_{16} as there is a 16mm cutting surface on all files.

For example, an ISO K file size 25 has a D_{0} value of 0.25mm diameter at its tip. If you were to move 6mm coronally on this file from D_{0}, the cross sectional diameter would be:

0.25mm + (6mmx0.02mm)=0.37mm

=== Protaper series ===
The range of files are available as hand and rotary. The first files in the series are termed SX, S1 and S2. These are used to improve access to the canals by first creating a coronal flare in the crown-down technique.

- SX files: D0 value of 0.19 mm
- S1 files: D0 value of 0.17 mm
- S2 files: D0 value of 0.20 mm

SX files are typically used first as they are shorter in overall length 19 mm and so are good in cases of restrictive space. The canal is prepped in the coronal 2/3 with these files as part of the crown-down technique.

After this, files named F1, F2, F3 etc. are used with increasing D0 values. These are used to shape the canal.

- F1 files: D0 value of 0. 20mm
- F2 files: D0 value of 0.25mm
- F3 files: D0 value of 0.30mm etc.

Between each of these finishing files, you should recapitulate the canal using the corresponding (with the same D0 value) K file. This prevents procedural errors, confirms the canal remains patent and prevents dentine swarf build up in within the canal. Complete copious irrigation in between each file.

== Rotary files ==
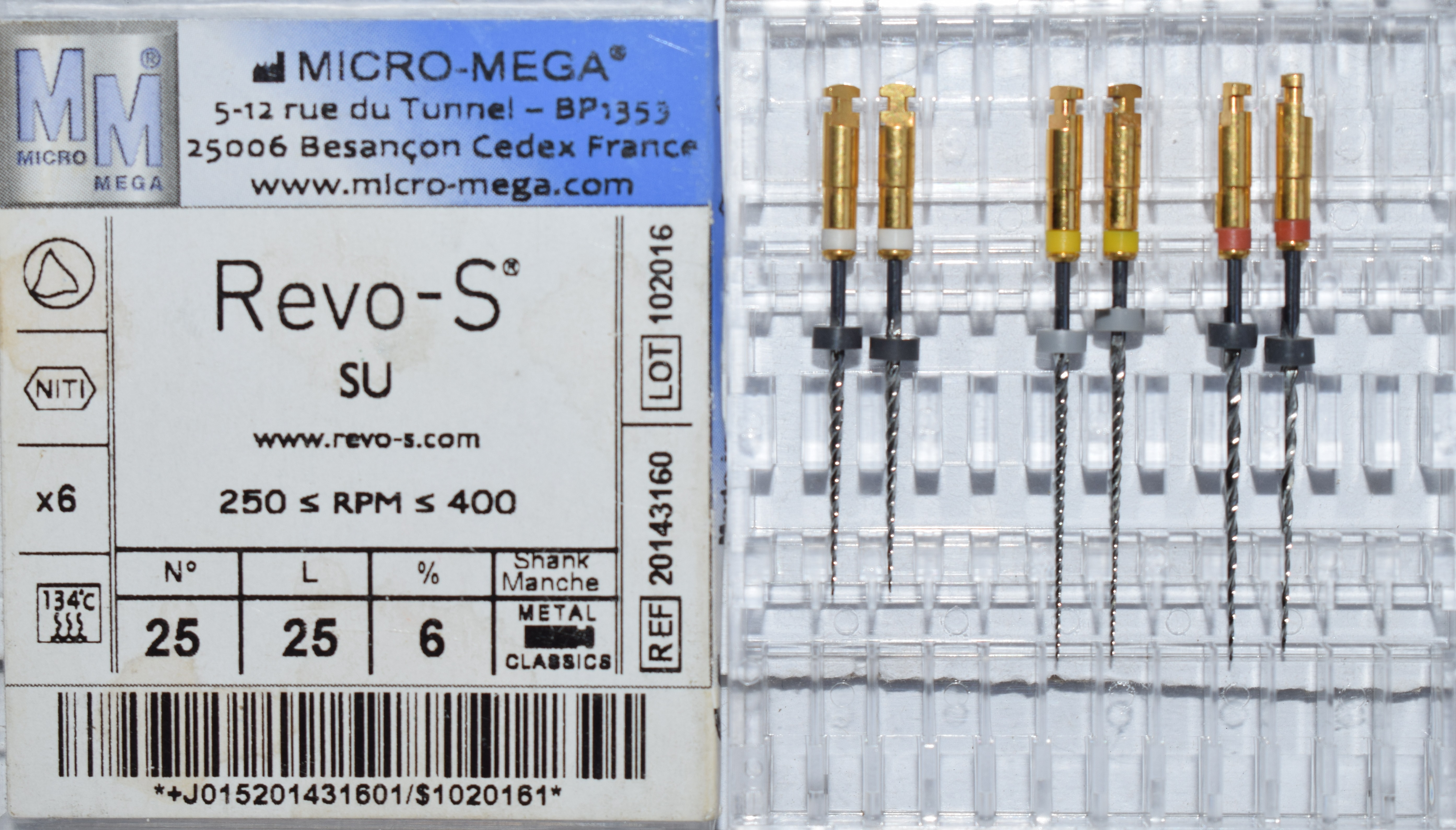
Revo-S file system SC1, SC2 and SU shaping files by Micromega

The introduction of Nickel Titanium in dentistry has allowed the use of rotary systems to be used to prepare root canals safely and predictably. Rotary instrumentation is known to have an improved cutting efficiency when compared with hand filing techniques. It is advisable to use a dedicated electric endodontic motor where torque and speed can be easily controlled dependent on the system chosen. Despite the advantages of rotary systems, it is always recommended to create a glide path with hand files in each canal prior to rotary instrumentation. There are numerous rotary files available on the market, including a variety of systems from different manufacturers.

=== Reciprocating systems ===
Reciprocating systems involve rotation of the file in both anti-clockwise and clockwise directions. This is similar to the ‘balanced force’ mechanism used with hand files. When the file is used in an anti-clockwise direction, it engages dentine and is quickly followed by a clockwise turn before re-engaging the root canal wall and shearing the dentine. Benefits of a reciprocating system include:

- Reduced risk of cyclical failure
- Reduced risk of torsional failure
- Simple protocol with single file (small, regular or large based on canal size) therefore more cost effective

=== Self-adjusting files ===
Self-adjusting file systems have been developed to overcome complications that arise due to complex anatomy and canal configurations. These files are used in a rotary hand piece and consist of a flexible, thin NiTi lattice with a hollow centre that adapt three-dimensionally to the shape of a given root canal, including its cross section. The files are operated with vibratory in-and-out motion, with continuous irrigation of disinfectant delivered by a peristaltic pump through the hollow file. A uniform layer of dentin is removed from the whole circumference of the root canal, thus achieving the main goals of root canal treatment while preserving the remaining root dentin. The 3D scrubbing effect of the file, combined with the fresh irrigant, result in clean canals, which in turn facilitate better obturation. More effective disinfection of flat-oval root canals is another goal that is simultaneously attained.

=== D-files ===
D files are a selection of bespoke rotary files that are commonly used in re-treatment cases for the efficient removal of gutta percha. They are used in sequence to remove the coronal (D1), mid (D2) and apical (D3) 1/3 root filling material more efficiently before the final shaping with conventional instruments. D1 is 16mm in length with a cutting end tip to engage the filling material in the canal. D2 and D3 are 18mm and 22mm in length respectively, both are non end cutting and aim to not remove remaining dentine from canal walls in the process.

== Single use legislation (in the UK) ==
In 2007, new legislation documenting the possible risk of prion disease transmission via endodontic files/reamers during root canal treatment was published via the BDJ. The conclusions made were such that there was no significant risk associated but the implementation of single use instruments was introduced to take all possible precautions. This was primarily due to the shape and relative surface area of the files making thorough disinfection and sterilisation very difficult.

== Mechanisms of failure ==
Instrumentation of the root canal systems (RCS) can lead to procedural errors including ledging, zipping, canal perforation and apex transportation all of which can be somewhat successfully resolved through further manual corrective techniques. However, file separation whereby the instrument breaks in the canal, is the most concerning and problematic procedural error, with fractured endodontic instruments being the most commonly found object in the RCS. The incidence of file fracture has been found to range between 0.25-6% of cases. File separation will create an obstruction within the canal preventing adequate cleaning and shaping of the canal at and beyond the obstruction as well as under-filling of the RCS. This may ultimately lead to endodontic failure depending on the location at which the file fractured in the RCS.

The cause fracture of instruments can be divided into different factors, operator/ technique, anatomy and instrument.

=== Cyclic fatigue ===
i.e. the lack of flexibility of the instruments when negotiating particularly curved canals. The more curved the canal, the greater the cyclical fatigue placed on the instrument, as it is undergoing repetitive tensile and compressive stresses upon rotation no matter the flexibility of the alloy. Pre-curving of the stainless steel files for canal negotiation will work-harden them, rendering them more brittle and therefore are more likely to fracture. Such files should also not be twisted in an anticlockwise manner, as this may also lead to brittle fracture especially when there is increased torque. NiTi files have been designed with increased flexibility for canal negotiation, however this does not entirely negate the event of file separation. NiTi files undergo cyclic fatigue due to a change in the crystalline structure of the file whilst under stress resulting in the alloy becoming more brittle.

=== Flexural fatigue ===
i.e. overuse of the file. It is safe to assume that the more a file is used, the greater the risk of separation. However, one cannot dictate a specific number of times for use nor predict when a file is going to fracture. The introduction of single use files has reduced this risk somewhat, yet it is vital to regularly inspect the files upon removal from canals for damage. The problem comes when files separate without there being any visible sign of damage.

=== Torsional fatigue ===
Torque relates to the required force needed in order for an instrument to carry on rotating upon encountering frictional forces. A file may bind the wall of the root canal apically due to a larger diameter of the file compared with the canal causing friction. If rotational forces are still in motion, torque may reach a critical level and the file will fracture. The torque generated from smaller canals will be greater than in larger canals, as files will bind to the canal walls more readily through friction. The greater the diameter of the instrument, the more force it can withstand despite needing increased torque however, the less resistant it becomes to cyclic fatigue. Torsional fatigue can be somewhat limited through creation of a glide path and adopting the Crown-Down technique in a bid to reduce frictional forces.

=== Intrinsic file defects ===
Beware of surface defects arising from the manufacture of the files, which can propagate under fatigue by creating stress concentrations and ultimately lead to fracture. This holds especially true for NiTi files, which are manufactured via milling of alloy blanks using CAD-CAM, as opposed to twisting of the blanks like with stainless steel. Deeper cutting flutes will also create stress concentrations.

=== Operator related fracture ===
File failure could be attributed to the skill and chosen technique used for instrumentation by the operator. It is more often the way in which an instrument is used, as opposed to the number of times it has been used that causes fracture e.g. due to overloading. Aggressively inserting instruments into canals should be avoided, as this will increase the friction created between the canal walls and the file. Evidence shows that hand instrumentation will result in a lower risk of file fracture compared with rotary and this may be attributed to increased rotational speed, which enhances the effects of cyclic fatigue. Therefore, when using electric motors with rotary instruments, a low speed and low torque concept is recommended.

=== Minimising the risk of separation ===
1. Well-angled radiographs to determine canal curvature (this will however be a 2D representation of a 3D system)
2. Access cavity design (straight line access) and glide path
3. Crown Down instrumentation sequence to minimise friction
4. Wet canals for lubrication but beware of risk of corrosion to stainless steel instruments due to irrigants used in canals e.g. with EDTA or Sodium Hypochlorite
5. Regular file inspection before and during instrumentation
6. Set electric motors at low torque (follow manufacturer instruction for recommended speed and torque)
