= Lentulo spiral =

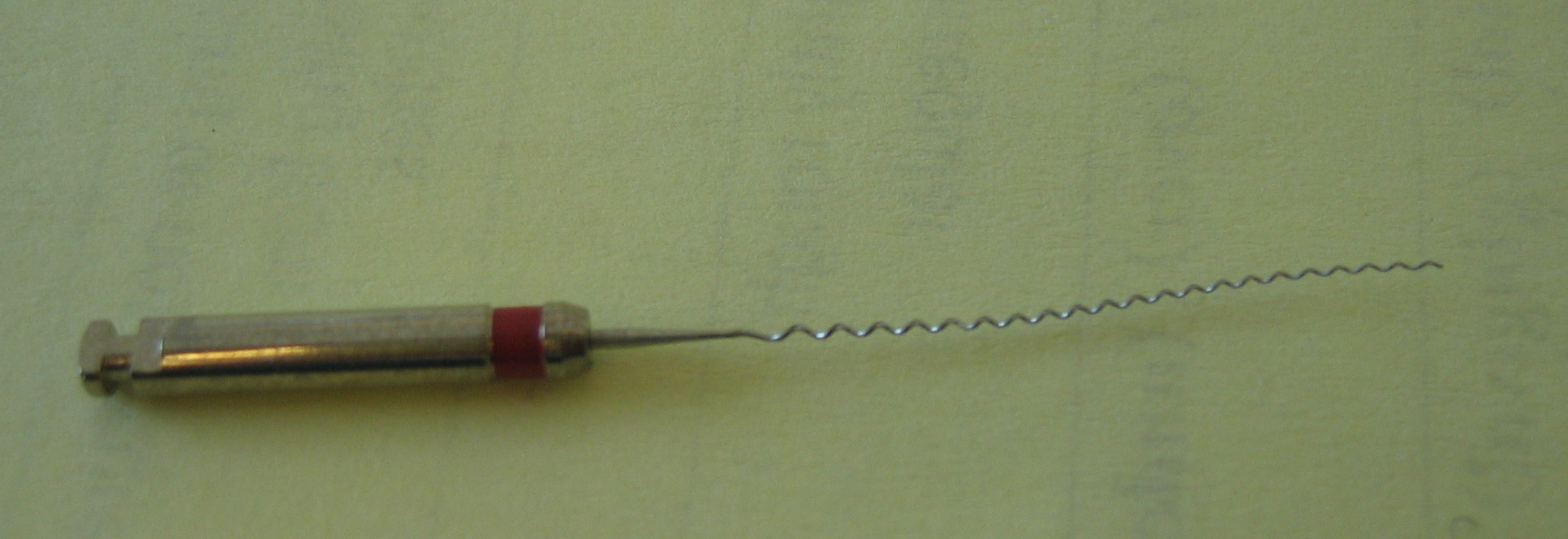
A Lentulo spiral. The notches at left allow it to fit into a slow-speed latch handpiece.

A Lentulo spiral is a dental instrument used to properly distribute root canal sealer and cement evenly throughout the root canal system, as when performing endodontic therapy or a post and core cementation.

The instrument has an atypical left-handed screw threading (like the screw in the left pedal of a bicycle) so that the application of sealer or cement will flow down the tip of the spiral when the slow-speed is in forward mode.

A common criticism of the Lentulo spiral is that the long term failures resulting from marginally poorer cement/sealer distribution are less problematic than the possibility of the spiral breaking inside the root canal. Proper use, maintenance, and disposal of old instruments should minimize breakage however.

Maillefer’s Lentulo spiral, produced by Dentsply, is the only one licensed to use the Lentulo name; however, the term is generally used to refer to any of the various brands of root canal sealer and cement distributing spirals.

== Use with resin cements ==
Use of a Lentulo spiral is contraindicated with resin cements because the rapidity and efficacy of stirring effect accelerates the setting action of the cement, causing it to set too quickly, preventing proper post placement and increasing apical back pressure.
