= Apex location =

Apex location is a method of determining the length of the root canal of a tooth - manually or with a mechanical canal instrument that passes a low intensity electric current through the tooth.

The electrical characteristics of the tooth structure are measured and the exact position of the instrument in the tooth is determined. When the tool tip touches the top of the tooth, the instrument signals that the apical foramen is reached. Whenever the channel instrument is pulled out its length can be measured to determine the depth of the root canal and all other dental tools can be adjusted to this length.

The apex is the tip of the tooth’s root. On the apex, there is an opening called Apical foramen. That is the place where all the blood vessels and nerves come inside the tooth. The apex is located on the tip of the root, or on the pointed end of it. Different teeth have a different number of roots. For example, the incisors have only one root and one apex. Teeth that have two roots have two apexes and so on.

== Methods of measurement ==
=== Method of Sonada ===
The method of Sonada measures the canal's impedance using one or more electric frequencies. The method tracks the penetration of the instrument in the canal. It is unreliable though in the presence of fluid in the canal which requires additional drying.

=== Method of Kobayashi ===
The method of Kobayashi performs a calculation of the ratio of the measured impedance of two or more electric frequencies. The method is highly accurate in the presence of fluid in the root canal. The method does not provide good monitoring of the penetration before reaching the apex. This method faces difficulties when working in a dry canal. Therefore the canal should be moistened. After measurement the canal should be dried.

=== Adaptive method ===
The Adaptive method of measurement is implemented by the so-called electronic apex locator. In the process of penetrating the instrument makes continuous measurements and selects a suitable method of measurement. In case of dry canal the device uses the method of Sonada. In case of wet canal the device automatically adjusts the measurement method of Kobayashi. The adaptive method is highly accurate and does not require moistening or drying the canal.

== External sources ==
- Adaptive methods for apex location
- Color Atlas and Textbook of Oral Anatomy, Histology, and Embryology by B. K. Berkovitz, G. R. Holland, B. J. Moxham Hardcover,
