= Electronic apex locator =

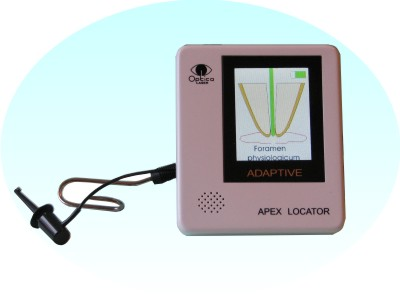

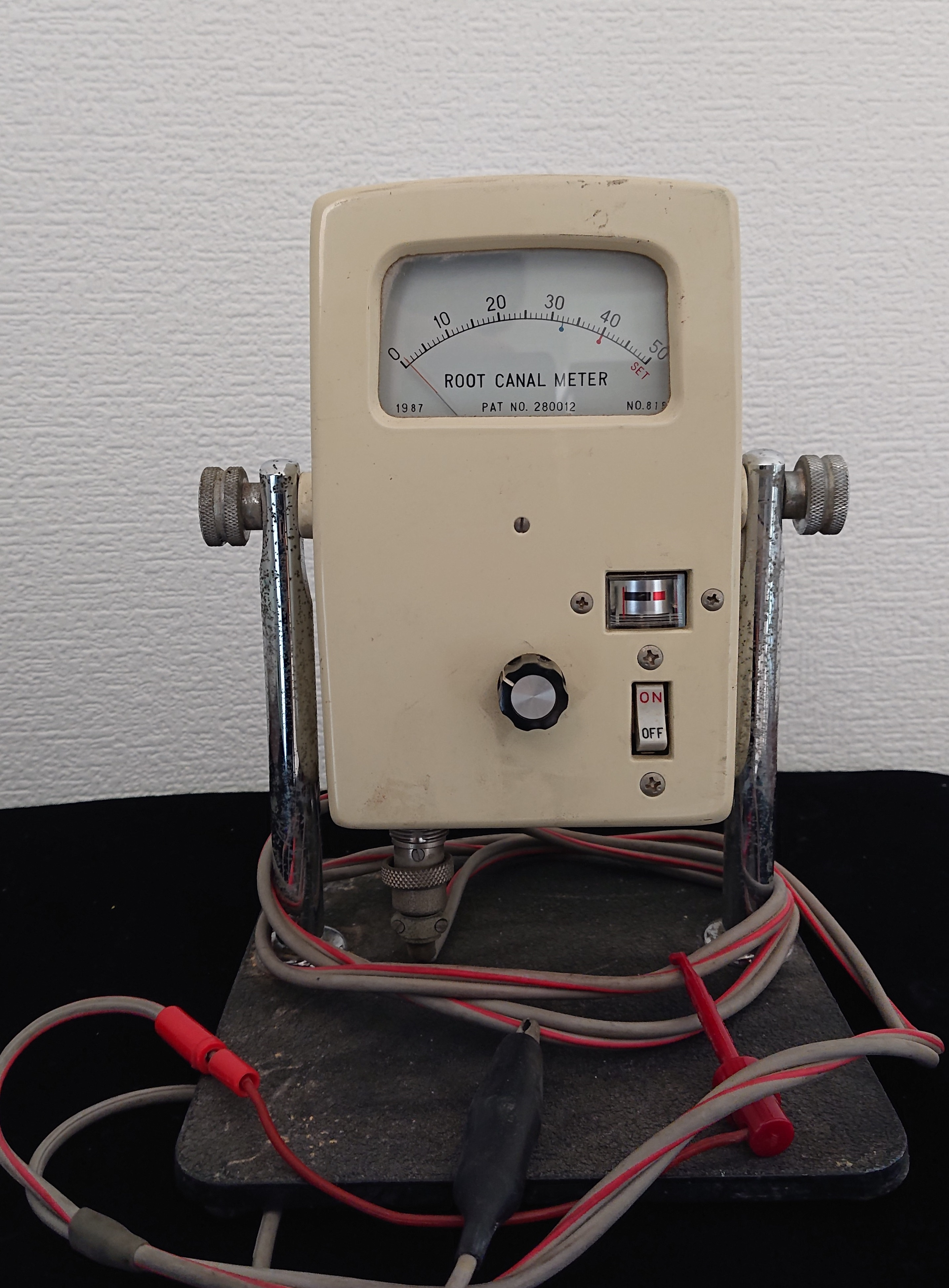
Root canal meter, the world's first electrical root canal length measuring instrument released by Onuki Medical Instruments in 1969

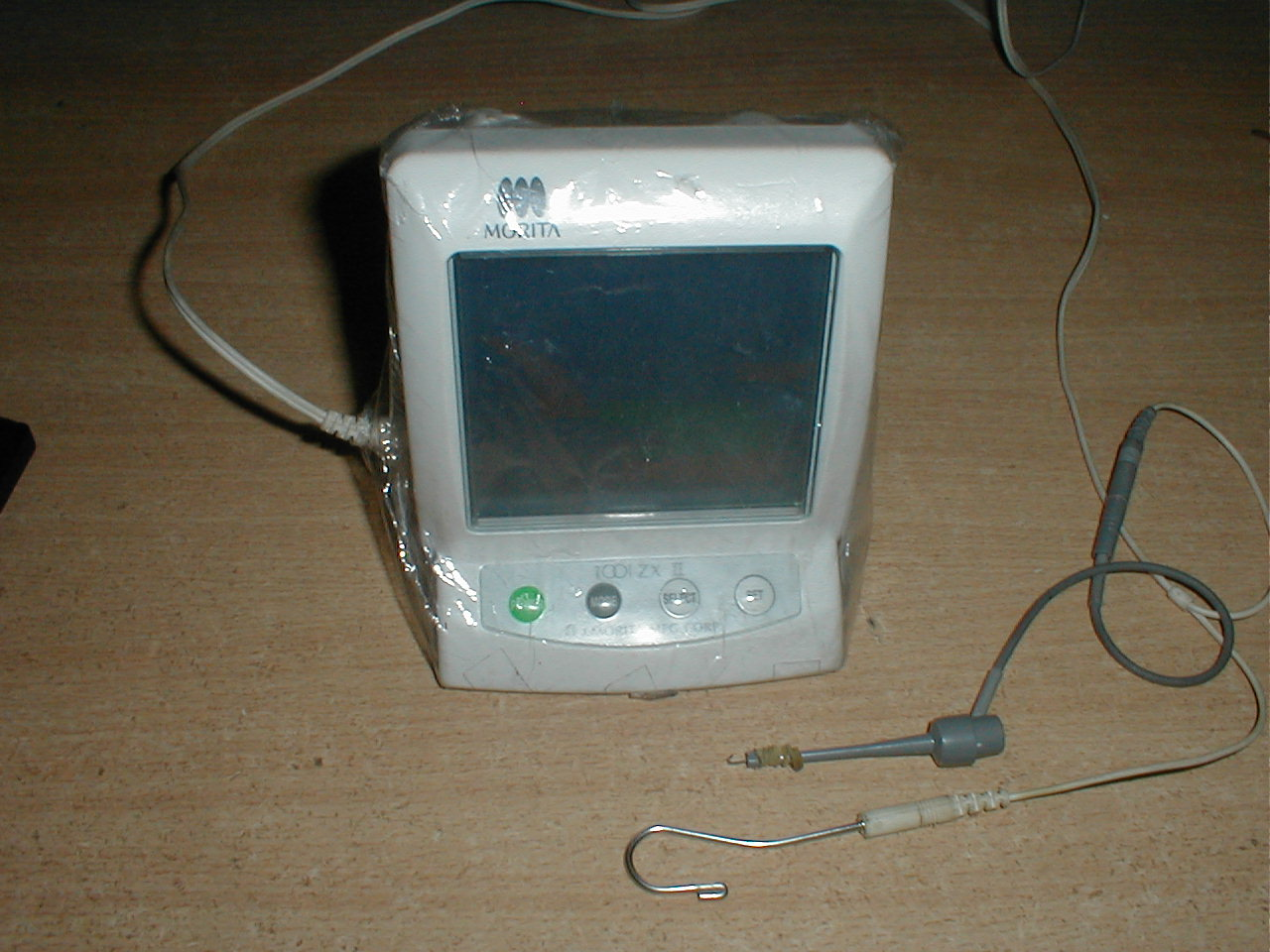
Apex locator

An electronic apex locator is an electronic device used in endodontics to determine the position of the apical constriction and thus determine the length of the root canal space. The apex of the root has a specific resistance to electrical current, and this is measured using a pair of electrodes typically hooked into the lip and attached to an endodontic file.

The electronic principle is relatively simple and is based on electrical resistance; when a circuit is complete (tissue is contacted by the tip of the file), resistance decreases markedly and current suddenly begins to flow. Various devices signal this event by a beep, a buzz, a flashing light, digital readouts, or a pointer on a dial.

== History and uses ==
The original electronic apex locators operated on the direct current principle. A problem with these devices was that conductive fluids such as hemorrhage, exudate, or irrigant in the canal would permit current flow and therefore a false reading. Newer devices are impedance-based, using alternating current of two frequencies;these measure and compare two electrical impedances that change as the file moves apically. The benefit is that these devices are much less affected by fluid conductive media in the canal. The impedance type apex locators have been demonstrated to be 80 to 95% accurate in identifying the apical foramen. Therefore after obtaining a reading, 1 to 2 mm is subtracted as the corrected working length.

Electronic apex locators have been shown to be more accurate than radiography when determining the position of the apical foramen. All apex locators have two electrodes, one is connected to an endodontic instrument, the other is connected to the patient's body (on the lip or an electrode in his hand). The electrical circuit is completed, when the instrument is introduced into the root canal in an apical direction, and touches the periodontal tissues.

== Principle of operation ==
The operating principle of modern electronic apex locators is based on the measurement of electrical impedance within the root canal system. An electrical circuit is formed between an endodontic file inserted into the root canal and an external electrode attached to the patient's oral mucosa. A small alternating current is passed through this circuit, and the device continuously measures changes in impedance as the file advances apically Impedance is the total resistance of electrical equipment to alternating current.

As the file approaches the apical constriction, the electrical characteristics of the surrounding tissues change significantly. The dentin and intracanal contents exhibit different conductive properties compared to the periodontal ligament and periapical tissues. Therefore, when the file tip reaches the apical foramen, a characteristic and reproducible change in impedance occurs, allowing the device to identify the canal terminus and estimate the position of the apical constriction

Early generations of apex locators relied on direct current resistance measurements, assuming a constant resistance value between the periodontal ligament and oral mucosa. However, these devices were highly sensitive to canal contents such as blood, irrigants, and electrolytes. To overcome these limitations, contemporary EALs employ impedance-based systems using alternating current and multiple frequencies (Nekoofar et al., 2006; Kim et al., 2012).

== Adaptive Apex Locators ==
Adaptive Apex Locator overcomes as the disadvantages of the popular 4th generation apex locators – low accuracy on working in wet canals, as well the disadvantages of devices from previous generations. Though, fifth generation locators can experience difficulty when working in dry canals and require additional wetting. Adaptive Apex Locator continuously defines humidity of the canal and immediately adapts for dry or wet canal. On this way is possible to be measured as in dry and in additional wetted canals as well, canals with blood or exudates, canals with still not-extirpated pulp.

== Accuracy of Apex Locator ==
Modern EALs are highly accurate, generally achieving a precision rate of 80% to 95% within +/- 0.5mm of the apical constriction. They are widely considered more reliable than traditional radiography alone because radiographs provide a 2D image of a 3D structure and the "radiographic apex" often does not coincide with the anatomical "apical foramen." Based on the findings of this study, all four generations of apex locators under review were found to be accurate in measuring working length. Hence, the generation of an apex locator does not play a significant role in how accurately electronic devices determine working length.

=== Factors affecting accuracy ===
1. Canal content: Accurate readings cannot be obtained if there's vital tissue or fluid in canal. It is influenced by moisture content of the root canal and diameter of the apical foramen. However, these resistance-type EALs often yield inaccurate results when electrolytes, excessive moisture, vital pulp tissue, exudates, or excessive hemorrhage are present in the canals.
2. File size: In certain clinical situations, such as wide canals or with immature or beating apices, the accuracy of EALs might be affected by the small size and small diameter of the file because a gap with the canal diameter is likely to be created. In these cases, a file with a larger diameter will have a tighter and therefore more accurate fit with the canal walls.
3. Irrigating solution: Of the irrigating solutions tested, least effect on the accuracy of EAL was seen with 2% chlorhexidine and the highest effect was seen with 5% NaOCl.

== Advantage over radiograph ==
Radiographic determination of working length has been used for many years. The radiographic apex is defined as the anatomical end of the root as seen on the radiograph, while the apical foramen is the region where the canal leaves the root surface next to the periodontal ligament. When the apical foramen exits to the side of the root or in a buccal or lingual direction it becomes difficult to view on the radiograph.

The most significant advantage of an EAL is its ability to locate the Apical Constriction. Radiographs can only show the "radiographic apex" (the visual tip of the root). However, the biological exit of the canal (the apical foramen) is often located 0.5 mm to 3.0 mm away from the radiographic apex and can exit on the side of the root, making it invisible on a 2D X-ray.

Anatomical structures like the malar process, thick cortical bone, or adjacent roots can hide the apex on an X-ray. EALs are unaffected by these anatomical overlays.

The perceived length of a root on an X-ray changes depending on the angle of the X-ray tube (foreshortening or elongation). EALs provide a direct physical measurement that is not subject to visual distortion.

EALs are highly beneficial for patients with a strong gag reflex or those who cannot tolerate intraoral sensors, as well as for pregnant patients where minimizing radiation is a priority.

== See also ==
- Apex location
