= Impacted wisdom teeth =

Teeth that do not fully grow out of the gums due to being blocked by other teeth

- Other names: Impacted third molars
- 3D CT of an impacted wisdom tooth adjacent the inferior alveolar nerve prior to removal of wisdom tooth
- Specialty: Dentistry, oral and maxillofacial surgery
- Symptoms: Localized pain and swelling behind the last teeth
- Complications: Infections, loss of adjacent teeth, cysts
- Usual onset: Late teens, early 20s
- Types: Full vs partially impacted, direction of impaction
- Causes: Congenital
- Diagnostic method: Examination, x-ray
- Differential diagnosis: Other causes for dental pain, TMJ pain
- Treatment: Good dental care, periodic monitoring, removal of wisdom teeth
- Frequency: 70-75% of the population

Impacted wisdom teeth is a condition where the third molars (wisdom teeth) are prevented from erupting into the mouth. This can be caused by a physical barrier, such as other teeth, or when the tooth is angled away from a vertical position. Completely unerupted wisdom teeth usually result in no symptoms, although they can sometimes develop cysts or neoplasms. Partially erupted wisdom teeth or wisdom teeth that are not erupted but are exposed to oral bacteria through deep periodontal pocket, can develop cavities or pericoronitis. Removal of impacted wisdom teeth is advised for the future prevention of or in the current presence of certain pathologies, such as caries (dental decay), periodontal disease or cysts. Prophylactic (preventative) extraction of wisdom teeth is preferred to be done at a younger age (middle to late teenage years) to take advantage of incomplete root development, which is associated with an easier surgical procedure and less probability of complications. However, in recent decades the preventive removal of impacted wisdom teeth has come into question, and some health organizations have issued guidelines calling to only remove impacted wisdom teeth in the case of current issues.

Impacted wisdom teeth are classified by their direction of impaction, their depth compared to the biting surface of adjacent teeth and the amount of the tooth's crown that extends through gum tissue or bone. Impacted wisdom teeth can also be classified by the presence or absence of symptoms and disease. Screening for the presence of wisdom teeth often begins in late adolescence when a partially developed tooth may become impacted. Screening commonly includes a clinical examination as well as x-rays such as panoramic radiographs.

Infection resulting from impacted wisdom teeth can be initially treated with antibiotics, local debridement or surgical removal of the gum overlying the tooth. Over time, most of these treatments tend to fail and patients develop recurrent symptoms. The most common treatment for recurrent pericoronitis is wisdom tooth removal. The risks of wisdom tooth removal are roughly proportional to the difficulty of the extraction. Sometimes, when there is a high risk to the inferior alveolar nerve, only the crown of the tooth will be removed (intentionally leaving the roots) in a procedure called a coronectomy. The long-term risk of coronectomy is that chronic infection can persist from the tooth remnants. The prognosis for the second molar is good following the wisdom teeth removal with the likelihood of bone loss after surgery increased when the extractions are completed in people who are 25 years of age or older. A treatment controversy exists about the need for and timing of the removal of disease-free impacted wisdom teeth. Supporters of early removal cite the increasing risks for extraction over time and the costs of monitoring the wisdom teeth. Supporters for retaining wisdom teeth cite the risk and cost of unnecessary surgery.

The condition can be common, with up to 72% of the Swedish population affected. Wisdom teeth have been described in the ancient texts of Plato and Hippocrates, the works of Charles Darwin and in the earliest manuals of operative dentistry. It was the meeting of sterile technique, radiology, and anesthesia in the late 19th and early 20th centuries that allowed the more routine management of impacted wisdom teeth.

== Classification ==
All teeth are classified as either developing, erupted (into the mouth), embedded (failure to erupt despite lack of blockage from another tooth), or impacted. Impacted teeth are ones that fail to erupt due to blockage from other teeth. Wisdom teeth, as the last teeth to erupt in the mouth are the most likely to become impacted. They develop between the ages of 14 and 25, with 50% of root formation completed by age 16, and 95% of all teeth erupted by the age of 25, however, some tooth movement can continue beyond the age of 25.

Impacted wisdom teeth are classified by the direction and depth of impaction, the amount of available space for tooth eruption, and the amount of soft tissue or bone (or both) that covers them. The classification structure helps clinicians estimate the risks for impaction, infections and complications associated with wisdom teeth removal. Wisdom teeth are also classified by the presence (or absence) of symptoms and disease.

Impacted wisdom teeth are often described by the direction of their impaction (forward tilting, or mesioangular being the most common), the depth of impaction and the age of the patient as well as other factors such as pre-existing infection or the presence of pathology (cysts, tumors or other disease). Each of these factors is used to predict the difficulty (and rate of complications) when removing an impacted tooth, with age being the most reliable predictor rather than the orientation of the impaction.

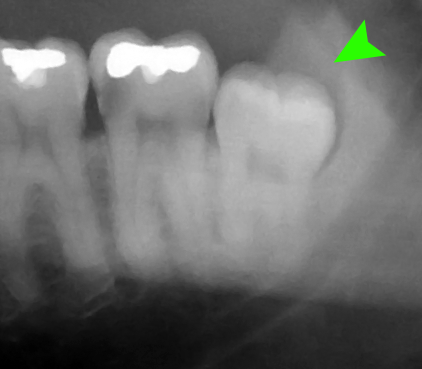
Impacted wisdom tooth with a backward tilt (distoangular impaction) and chronic infection to back of crown (green arrow)

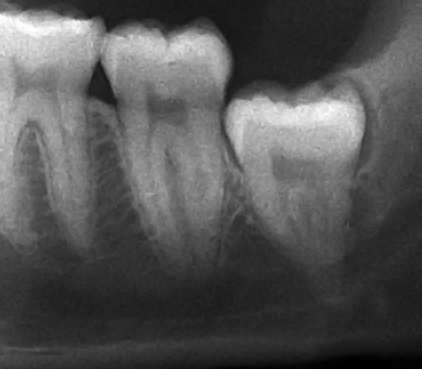
Impacted wisdom tooth with no tilt (vertical impaction)

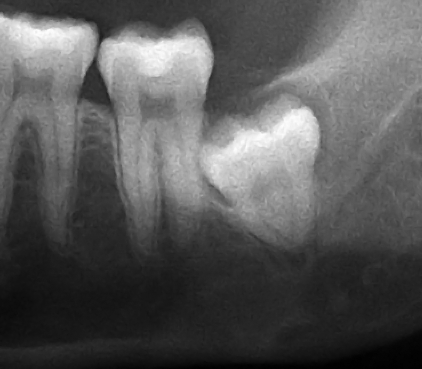
Impacted wisdom tooth that is tilted forward (mesioangular impaction)

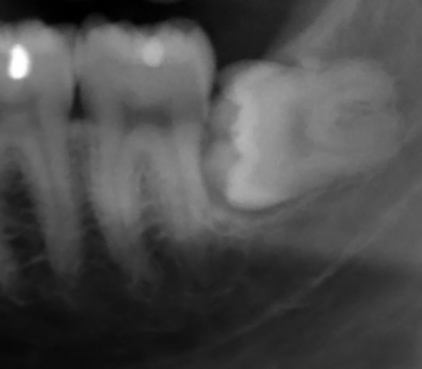
Impacted wisdom tooth with a horizontal orientation (horizontal impaction)

Another classification system often taught in U.S. dental schools is known as Pell and Gregory Classification. This system includes a horizontal and vertical component to classify the location of third molars (predominately applicable to lower third molars): the third molar's relationship to the level of the teeth already in the mouth, being the vertical or x-component and to the anterior border of the ramus being the horizontal or y-component.

== Signs and symptoms ==
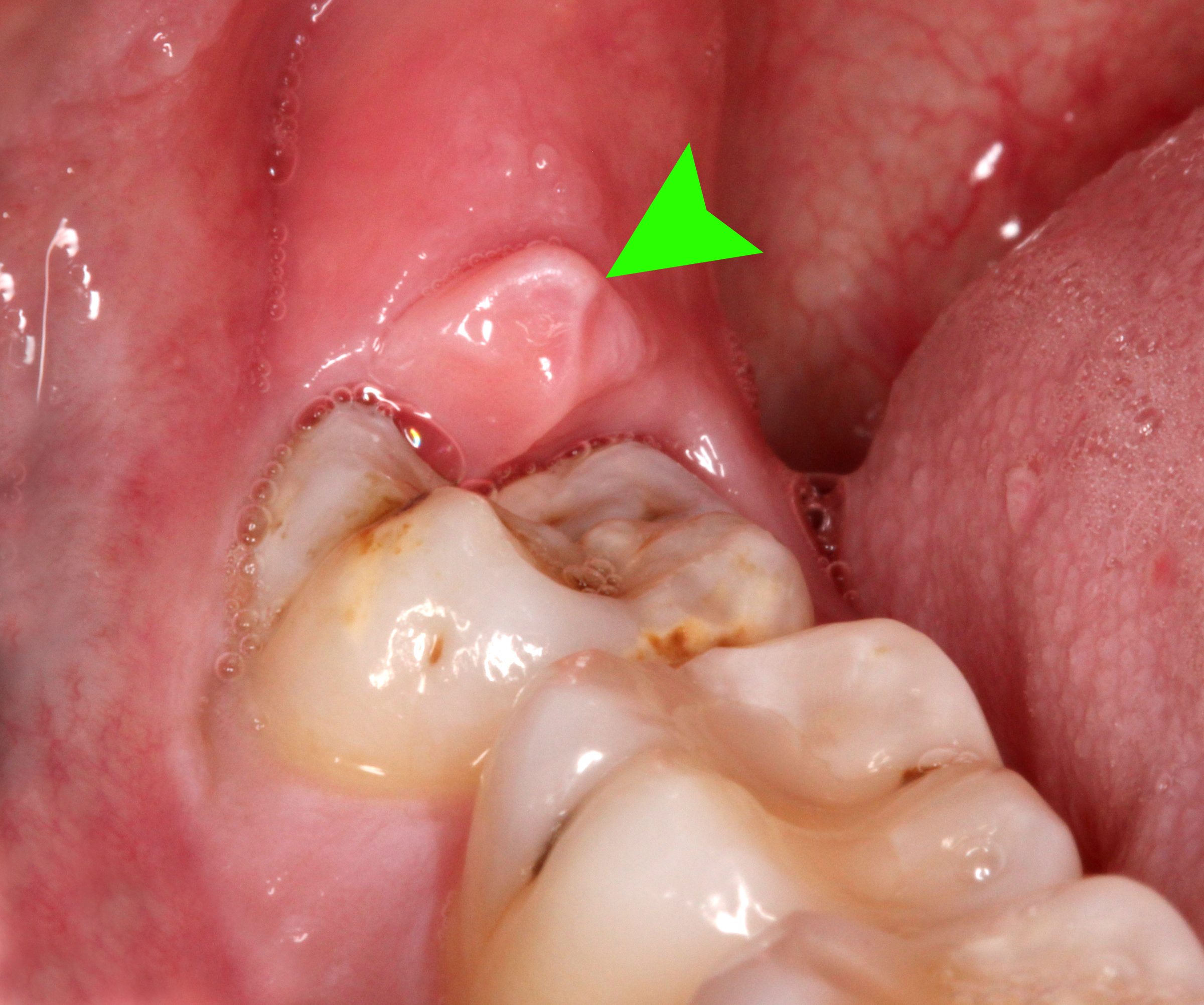
Pericoronitis (green arrow) in lower right wisdom tooth

Impacted wisdom teeth without communication to the mouth, that have no pathology associated with the tooth, and have not caused tooth resorption on the blocking tooth, rarely have symptoms. The chances of developing pathology on an impacted wisdom tooth that is not communicating with the mouth is approximately 12%. However, when impacted wisdom teeth communicate with the mouth, food and bacteria penetrate to the space around the tooth and cause symptoms such as localized pain, swelling and bleeding of the tissue overlying the tooth. The tissue overlying the tooth is called the operculum, and the disorder is called pericoronitis which means inflammation around the crown of the tooth. Low grade chronic periodontitis commonly occurs on either the wisdom tooth or the second molar, causing less obvious symptoms such as bad breath and bleeding from the gums. The teeth can also remain asymptomatic (pain free), even with disease.

The term asymptomatic means that the person has no symptoms. The term asymptomatic should not be equated with absence of disease. Most diseases have no symptoms early in the disease process. A pain-free or asymptomatic tooth can still be infected for many years before pain symptoms develop.

== Causes ==
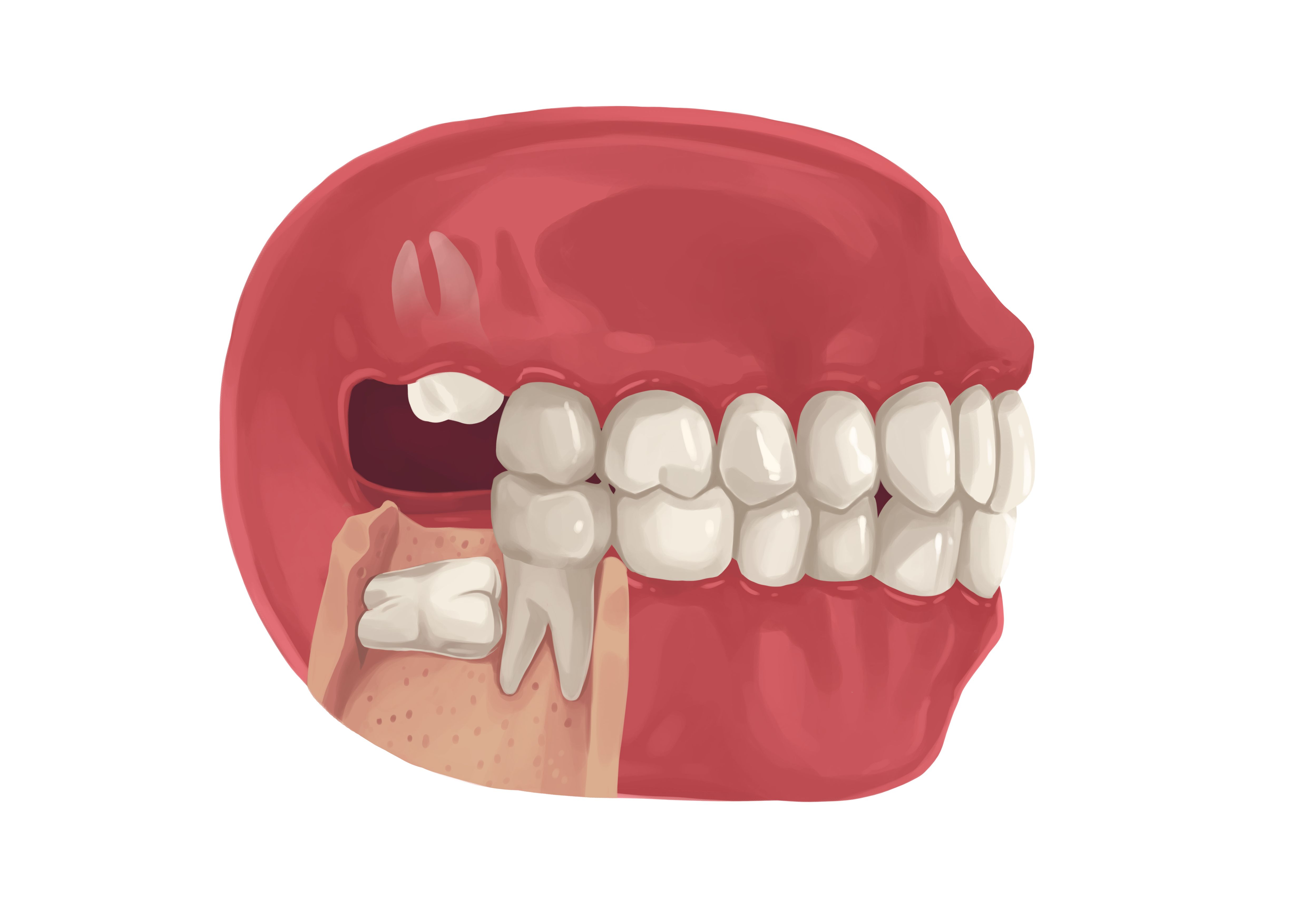
Impacted wisdom tooth

Wisdom teeth become impacted when there is not enough room in the jaws to allow for all of the teeth to erupt into the mouth. Because the wisdom teeth are the last to erupt, due to insufficient room in the jaws to accommodate more teeth, the wisdom teeth become stuck in the jaws, i.e., impacted. There is a genetic predisposition to tooth impaction. Genetics plays an important, albeit unpredictable role in dictating jaw and tooth size and tooth eruption potential of the teeth. Studies have shown that impacted teeth, and crowded teeth in general, arose in humans in the move from hunter-gatherers to farmers, and increased with the industrial revolution, as well it has been shown that young animals fed on uncooked vegetables as opposed to cooked ones have larger jaws. This suggests that it is industrialized soft and processed diets that cause impacted wisdom teeth.

== Pathophysiology ==
Impacted wisdom tooth with caries and cyst (green arrow) displacing inferior alveolar nerve (blue)

Impactions completely covered by bone and soft tissue, do not communicate with the mouth, and have a low rate of clinically significant infection. Since the tooth never erupts, the dental follicle that surrounds the tooth does not degenerate during eruption, and can develop cysts or uncommon tumors over time. Estimates of the incidence of cysts or other neoplasms (almost all benign) around impacted teeth average at 3%, usually seen in people under the age of 40. This suggests that the chance of tumor formation decreases with age.

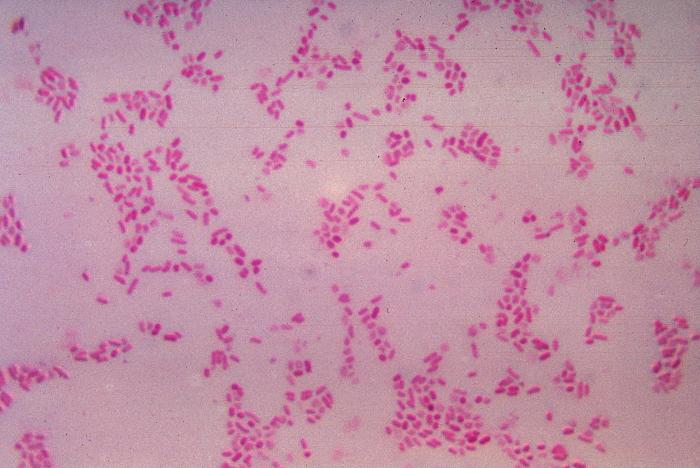
Bacteroides fragilis bacteria under microscope

For partially impacted teeth in those over 20 year of age, the most common pathology seen, and the most common reason for wisdom teeth removal, is pericoronitis or infection of the gum tissue over the impacted tooth. The bacteria associated with infections include Peptostreptococcus, Fusobacterium, and Bacteroides bacteria. The next most common pathology seen is cavities or tooth decay. Fifteen percent of people with retained wisdom teeth exposed to the mouth have cavities on the wisdom tooth or adjacent second molar due to a wisdom tooth. The rate of cavities on the back of the second molar has been reported anywhere from 1% to 19% with the wide variation attributed to increased age.

In five percent of cases, advanced periodontitis or gum inflammation between the second and third molars precipitates the removal of wisdom teeth. Among patients with retained, asymptomatic wisdom teeth, roughly 25% have gum infections (periodontal disease). Teeth with periodontal pockets of greater than 5mm have tooth loss rates that start at 10 teeth lost per 1000 teeth per year at 5mm to a rate of 70 teeth lost per year per 1000 teeth at 11mm. The risk of periodontal disease and caries on third molars increases with age with a small minority (less than 2%) of adults age 65 years or older maintaining the teeth without caries or periodontal disease and 13% maintaining unimpacted wisdom teeth without caries or periodontal disease. Periodontal probing depths increase over time to greater than 4 mm in a significant proportion of young adults with retained impacted wisdom teeth which is associated with increases in serum inflammatory markers such as interleukin-6, soluble intracellular adhesion molecule-1 and C-reactive protein.

Crowding of the front teeth is not believed to be caused by the eruption of wisdom teeth although this is a reason many dental clinicians use to justify wisdom teeth extraction.^{,}

== Diagnosis ==
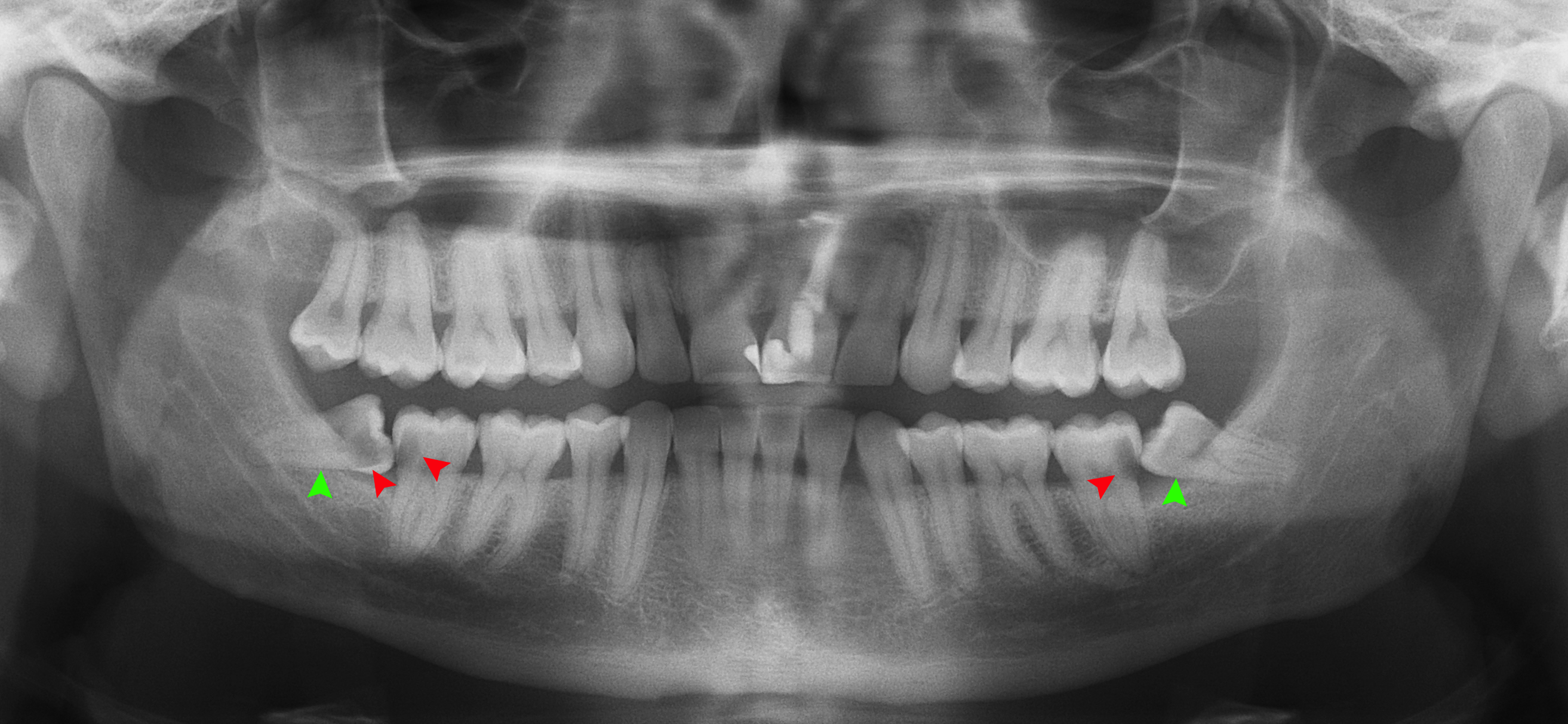
Panoramic radiograph of impacted lower wisdom teeth (green arrows) in a 26-year-old with dental caries (red arrows) on the adjacent teeth

The diagnosis of impaction can be made clinically if enough of the wisdom tooth is visible to determine its angulation, depth, and if the patient is old enough that further eruption or uprighting is unlikely. Wisdom teeth continue to move to the age of 25 years old due to eruption, and then continue some later movement owing to periodontal disease.

If the tooth cannot be assessed with clinical exam alone, the diagnosis is made using either a panoramic radiograph or cone-beam CT. Where unerupted wisdom teeth still have eruption potential several predictors are used to determine the chance of the teeth becoming impacted. The ratio of space between the tooth crown length and the amount of space available, the angle of the teeth compared to the other teeth are the two most commonly used predictors, with the space ratio being the most accurate. Despite the capacity for movement into early adulthood, the likelihood that the tooth will become impacted can be predicted when the ratio of space available to the length of the crown of the tooth is under 1.

== Screening ==
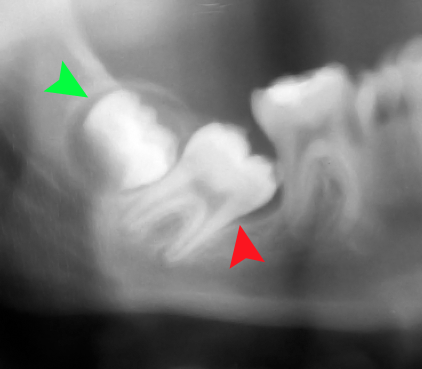
Impacted 2nd molar (red arrow) with developing wisdom tooth (green arrow)

There is no standard to screen for wisdom teeth. It has been suggested, absent evidence to support routinely retaining or removing wisdom teeth, that evaluation with panoramic radiograph, starting between the ages of 16 and 25 be completed every 3 years. Once there is the possibility of the teeth developing disease, then a discussion about the operative risks versus long-term risk of retention with an oral and maxillofacial surgeon or other clinician trained to evaluate wisdom teeth is recommended. These recommendations are based on expert opinion level evidence. Screening at a younger age may be required if the second molars (the "12-year molars") fail to erupt as ectopic positioning of the wisdom teeth can prevent their eruption. Radiographs can be avoided if the majority of the tooth is visible in the mouth.

== Treatment ==
Wisdom teeth that are fully erupted and in normal function need no special attention and should be treated just like any other tooth. It is more challenging to make treatment decisions with asymptomatic, disease-free wisdom teeth where there is a high probability that the teeth will develop disease over time, but none exists on examination, or on x-rays (see Treatment controversy below).

=== Preoperative planning ===
Before extraction of the third molar, the clinician may correlate the positions of the roots and the nerve canal using CBCT to plan the course of the surgery in advance. In the literature on extraction of mandibular third molars, CBCT is described as a method to clarify the relationship of the tooth to the Inferior alveolar nerve and to assess the risk of iatrogenic injury. If the roots have a complex morphology, the tooth may be sectioned into fragments for a more conservative extraction.

Understanding the process, from preparation to recovery, can help ease anxiety and ensure a smooth experience.

=== Local treatment ===
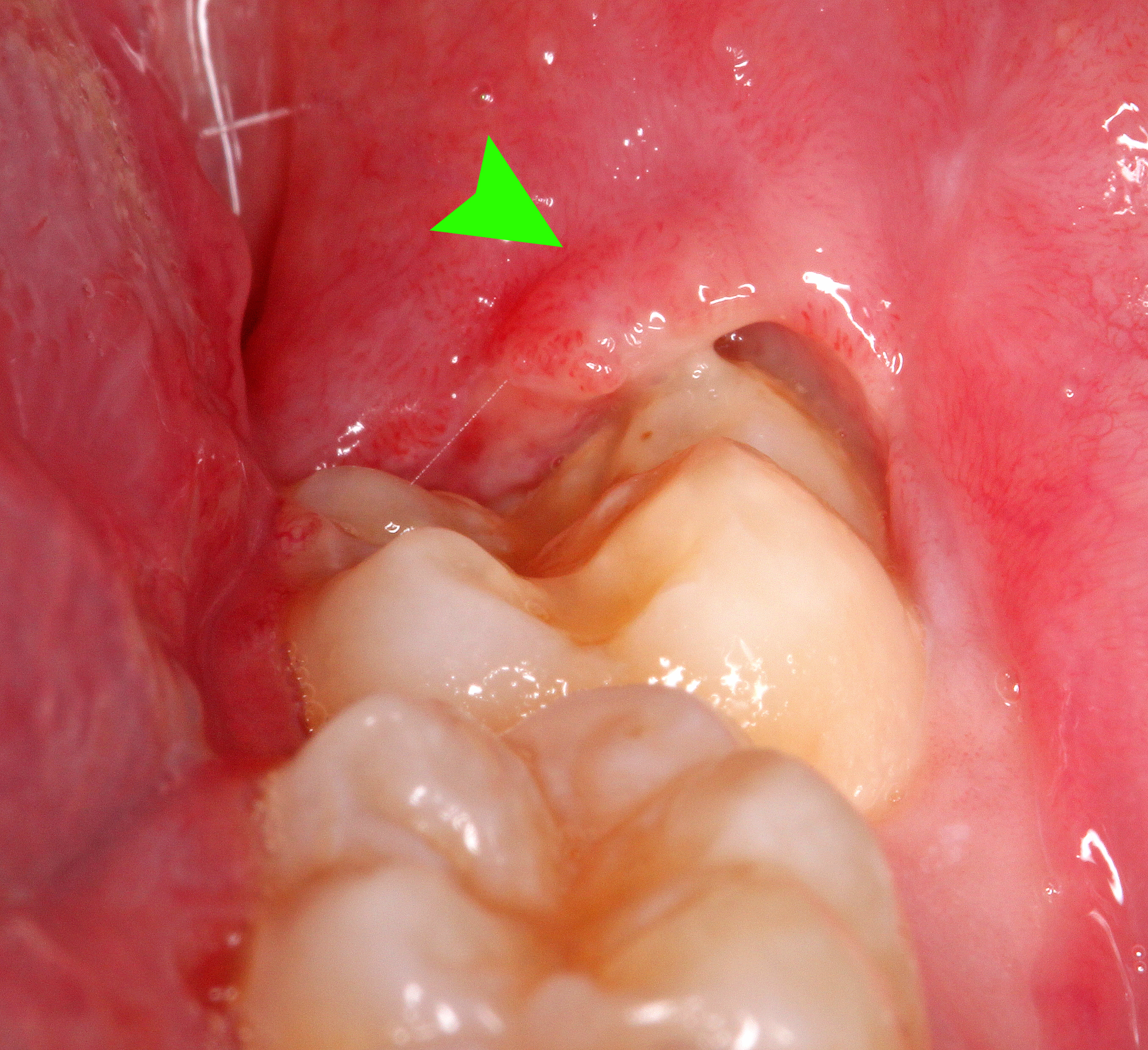
An operculum (green arrow) over a partially erupted lower left third molar with inflammation and pus (right of green arrow under tissue)

Pericoronitis is an infection of the operculum of a partially impacted wisdom tooth. It can be treated with local cleaning, an antiseptic rinse of the area and antibiotics if severe. Definitive treatment can be excision of the operculum, however, recurrence of these infections is high. Pericoronitis, while a small area of tissue, should be viewed with caution, because it lies near the anatomic planes of the neck and can progress to life-threatening neck infections.

=== Wisdom teeth removal ===
Wisdom teeth removal (extraction) is the most common treatment for impacted wisdom teeth. In the US, 10 million wisdom teeth are removed annually. The procedure can be either simple or surgical, depending on the depth of the impaction and angle of the tooth. Surgical removal is to create an incision in the mucosa of the mouth, remove bone of the mandible or maxilla adjacent the tooth, extract it or possibly section the tooth and extract it in pieces. This can be completed under local anaesthetic, sedation or general anaesthetic. As of 2020, the evidence is insufficient to recommend one type of surgical practice over another.

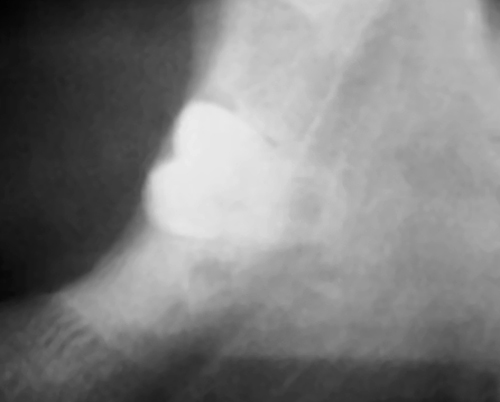
Radiograph of symptomatic and infected impacted wisdom tooth near inferior alveolar nerve

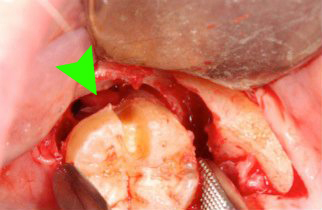
Nerve (green arrow) pierces the root of impacted wisdom tooth. Tooth sectioned from around nerve

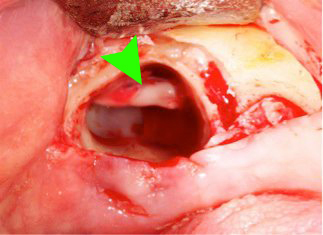
Socket of wisdom tooth with skeletonized inferior alveolar nerve (green arrow) intact

==== Recovery, risks and complications ====
Most people will experience pain and swelling (worst on the first post-operative day) then return to work after 2 to 3 days with the rate of discomfort decreased to about 25% by post-operative day 7 unless affected by dry socket: a disorder of wound healing that prolongs post-operative pain. It can be 4 to 6 weeks before patients are fully recovered with a full range of jaw movements.

A Cochrane investigation found that the use of antibiotics either just before or just after surgery reduced the risk of infection, pain and dry socket after wisdom teeth are removed by oral surgeons, but that using antibiotics also causes more side effects for these patients. Nineteen patients needed to receive antibiotics to prevent one infection. The conclusion of the review was that antibiotics given to healthy people to prevent infections may cause more harm than benefit to both the individual patients and the population as a whole. Another Cochrane Investigation has found post-operative pain is effectively managed with either ibuprofen, or ibuprofen in combination with acetaminophen.

Long-term complications can include periodontal complications such as bone loss on the second molar following wisdom teeth removal. Bone loss as a complication after wisdom teeth removal is uncommon in the young but present in 43% of those of 25 years of age or older. Injury to the inferior alveolar nerve resulting in numbness or partial numbness of the lower lip and chin has reported rates that vary widely from 0.04% to 5%. The largest study is from a survey of 535 oral and maxillofacial surgeons in California, where a rate of 1:2,500 was reported.

The large variation in report rates is attributed to variations in technique, the patient pool and surgeon experience. Other complications that are uncommon have been reported including persistent sinus communication, damage to adjacent teeth, lingual nerve injury, displaced teeth, osteomyelitis and jaw fracture. Alveolar osteitis, post-operative infection, excessive bleeding may also be expected.

==== Treatment controversy ====
Many impacted wisdom teeth are extracted prior to the age of 25, when full eruption can be reasonably expected and before symptoms or disease have begun. This has led to a treatment controversy generally referred to as the extraction of asymptomatic, disease-free wisdom teeth.

In 2000, the National Institute for Clinical Excellence (NICE) of the United Kingdom set guidelines to discontinue the removal of asymptomatic disease-free third molars in the UK National Health Service, stating that there was no reliable research evidence to support a health benefit to patients from the prophylactic removal of pathology-free impacted third molar teeth, in addition to the risks of removal and cost to the service. Advocates of the policy point out that the impacted wisdom teeth can be monitored and avoidance of surgery also means avoidance of the recovery, risks, complications and costs associated with it. Following implementation of the NICE guidelines the UK saw a decrease in the number of impacted third molar operations between 2000 and 2006 and a rise in the average age at extraction from 25 to 31 years. The American Public Health Association (APHA) has adopted a similar policy.

Those who argue against a blanket moratorium on the extraction of asymptomatic, disease-free wisdom teeth point out that wisdom teeth commonly develop periodontal disease or cavities which may eventually damage the second molars and that there are costs associated with monitoring wisdom teeth. They also point to the fact that there is an increase in the rate of post-operative periodontal disease on the second molar, difficulty of surgery and post-operative recovery time with age. The UK has also seen an increase in the rate of dental caries on the lower second molars increasing from 4–5% prior to the NICE guideline to 19% after its adoption. However, a study in 2014 found that the rates of hospitalizations for the removal of impacted wisdom teeth in the UK is 5 times smaller than in France and 7 times smaller than in Australia, which the authors said could be because of the UK's guidelines against the preventive removal of impacted wisdom teeth.

Although most studies arrive at the conclusion of negative long-term outcomes e.g. increased pocketing and attachment loss after surgery, it is clear that early removal (before 25 years old), good post-operative hygiene and plaque control, and lack of pre-existing periodontal pathology before surgery are the most crucial factors that minimise the probability of adverse post-surgical outcomes.

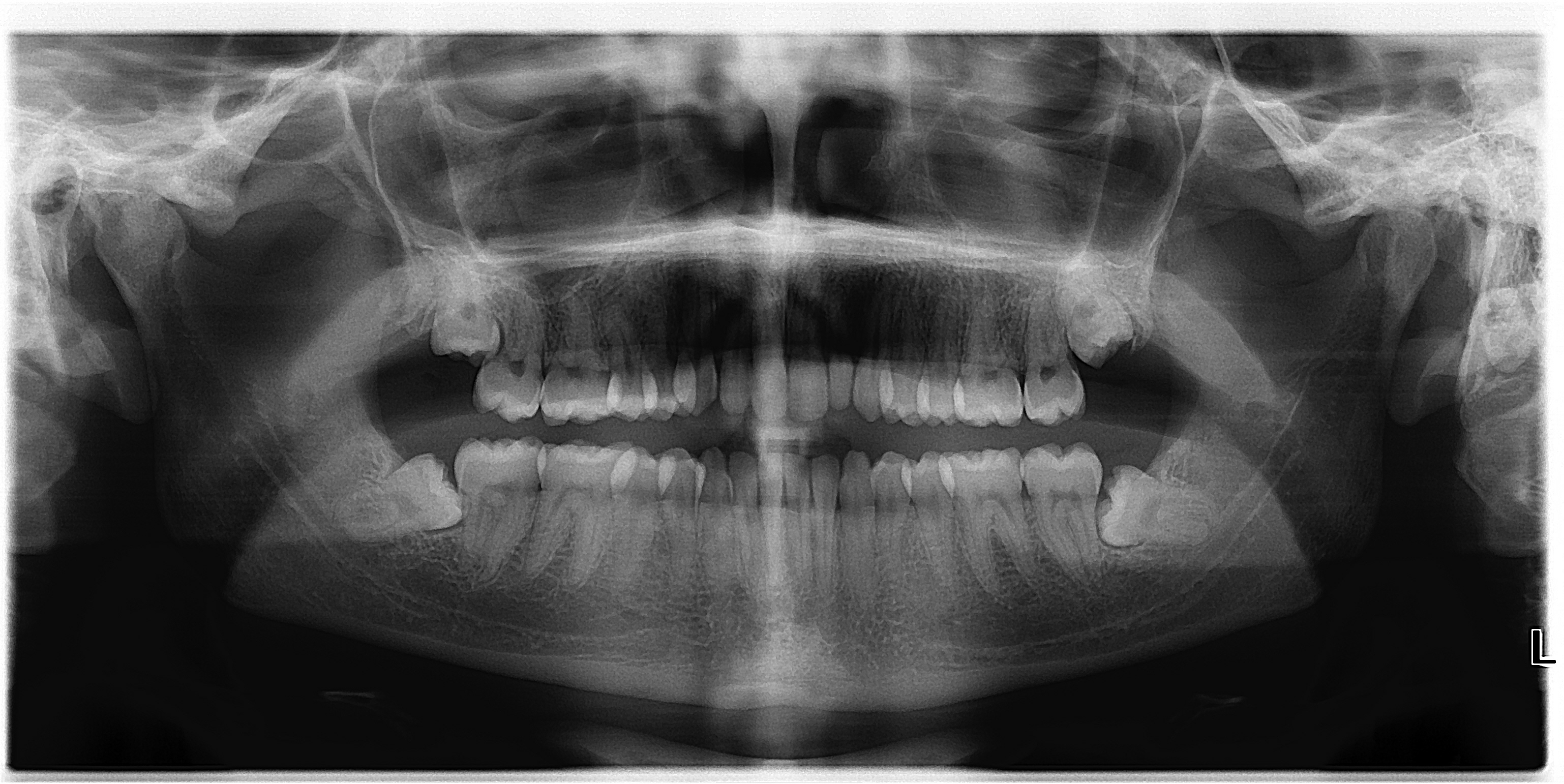
Asymptomatic disease-free impacted wisdom teeth in a 21-year-old

The Cochrane review of surgical removal versus retention of asymptomatic disease-free impacted wisdom teeth suggests that the presence of asymptomatic impacted wisdom teeth may be associated with increased risk of periodontal disease affecting adjacent 2nd molar (measured by distal probing depth > 4 mm on that tooth) in the long term. Few studies, however, met the criteria to be included in the Cochrane review and those that were included provided very low quality evidence and had a high risk of bias. Another study which was at high risk of bias, found no evidence to suggest that removal of asymptomatic disease-free impacted wisdom teeth has an effect on crowding in the dental arch. There is also insufficient evidence to highlight a difference in risk of decay with or without impacted wisdom teeth.

One trial in adolescents who had orthodontic treatment comparing the removal of impacted lower wisdom teeth with retention was identified. It only examined the effect on late lower incisor crowding and was rated 'highly biased' by the authors. The authors concluded that there is not enough evidence to support either the routine removal or retention of asymptomatic impacted wisdom teeth. Another randomised controlled trial done in the UK has suggested that it is not reasonable to remove asymptomatic disease-free impacted wisdom tooth merely to prevent incisor crowding as there is not strong enough evidence to show this association.

Due to the lack of sufficient evidence to determine whether such teeth should be removed or not, the patient's preference and values should be taken into account with clinical expertise exercised and careful consideration of risks and benefits to determine treatment. If it is decided to retain asymptomatic disease-free impacted wisdom teeth, clinical assessment at regular intervals is advisable to prevent undesirable outcomes (pericoronitis, root resorption, cyst formation, tumour formation, inflammation/infection).

=== Coronectomy ===
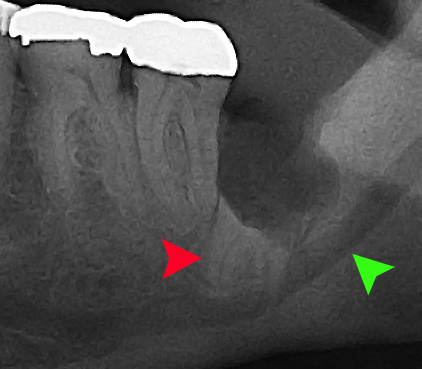
Coronectomy of impacted wisdom tooth post-op xray showing root remnants (red arrow) and inferior alveolar nerve (green arrow)

Coronectomy is a procedure where the crown of the impacted wisdom tooth is removed, but the roots are intentionally left in place. It is indicated when there is no disease of the dental pulp or infection around the crown of the tooth, and there is a high risk of inferior alveolar nerve injury.

Coronectomy, while lessening the immediate risk to the inferior alveolar nerve function has its own complication rates and can result in repeated surgeries. Between 2.3% and 38.3% of roots loosen during the procedure and need to be removed and up to 4.9% of cases require reoperation due to persistent pain, root exposure or persistent infection. The roots have also been reported to migrate in 13.2% to 85.9% of cases.

== Prognosis ==
The prognosis for impacted wisdom teeth depends on the depth of the impaction. When they lack a communication to the mouth, the main risk is the chance of a cyst or neoplasm forming in the tissues around the tooth (such as the dental follicle), which is relatively uncommon.

Once communicating with the mouth, the onset of disease or symptoms cannot be predicted but the chance of it does increase with age. Less than 2% of wisdom teeth are free of either periodontal disease or caries by age 65. Further, a systemic review found that between 30% – 60% of people with previously asymptomatic impacted wisdom teeth will have them extracted due to symptoms or disease, 4–12 years after initial examination.

Extraction of the wisdom teeth removes the disease on the wisdom tooth itself and also appears to improve the periodontal status of the second molar, although this benefit diminishes beyond the age of 25.

== Epidemiology ==
Few studies have looked at the percentage of the time wisdom teeth are present or the rate of wisdom teeth eruption. The lack of up to five teeth (excluding third molars, i.e. wisdom teeth) is termed hypodontia. Missing third molars occur in 9-30% of studied populations. One large scale study on a group of young adults in New Zealand showed 95.6% had at least 1 wisdom tooth with an eruption rate of 15% in the maxilla and 20% in the mandible. Another study on 5000 army recruits found 10,767 impacted wisdom teeth. The frequency of impacted lower third molars was found to be 72% in a Swedish study, and the frequency of retained impacted wisdom teeth that are free of disease and symptoms is estimated to be between 11.6% to 29%, a percentage which drops with age.

The incidence of wisdom tooth removal was estimated to be 4 per 1000 person years in England and Wales prior to the 2000 NICE guidelines.

== History ==
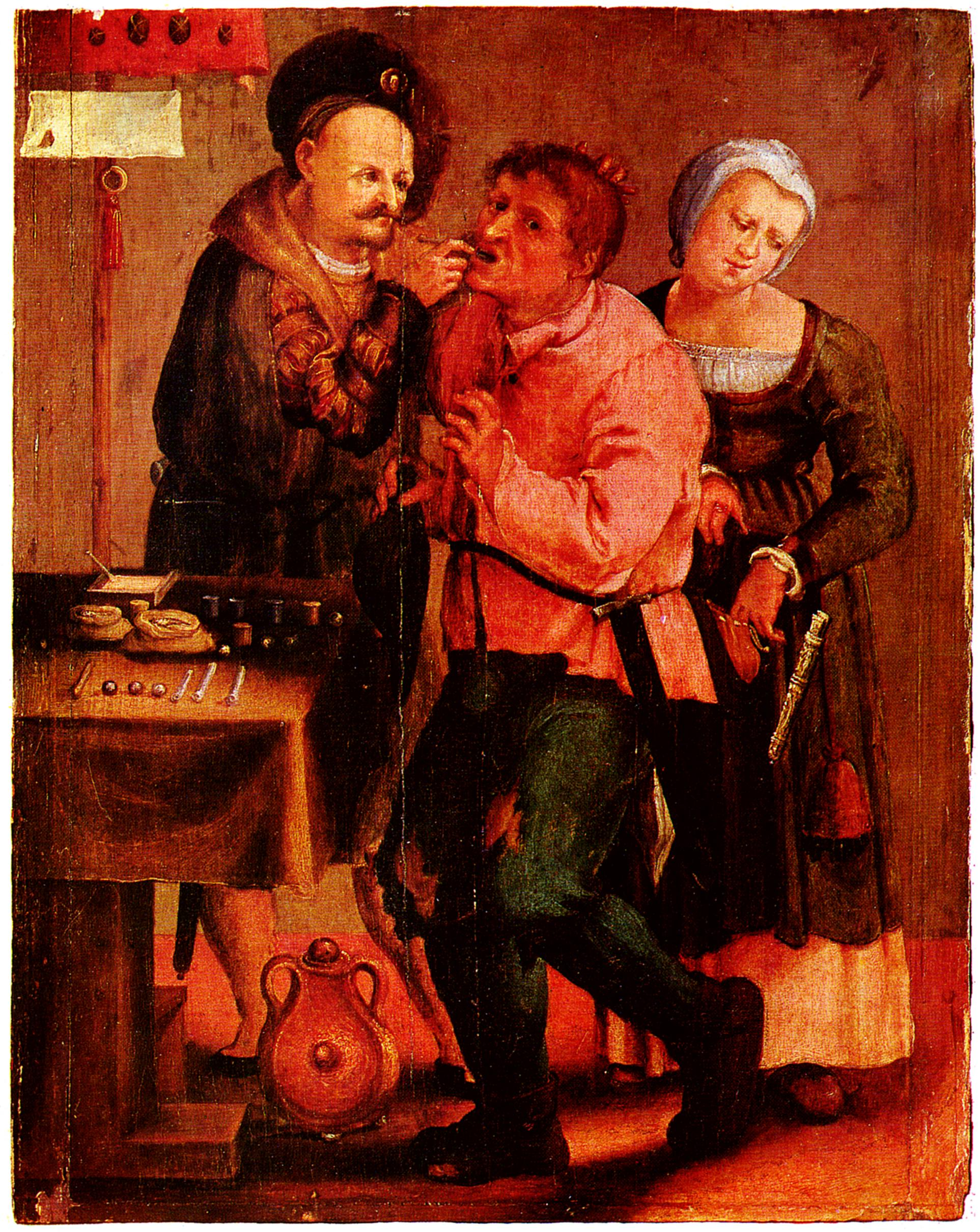
Farmer at the dentist, Johann Liss, c. 1616–17

Wisdom teeth have been described in the ancient texts of Plato and Hippocrates. "Teeth of wisdom" being from the Latin, dentes sapientiæ, which in turn is derived from the Hippocratic term, sophronisteres, from the Greek sophron, meaning prudent.

Charles Darwin believed the wisdom teeth to be in decline with evolution, a theory which his contemporary, Paolo Mantegazza, later proved to be false when he discovered Darwin was not opening the jawbones of specimens to find the impacted tooth stuck in the jaw.

In the late 19th and early 20th centuries, the collision of sterile technique, anaesthesia and radiology made routine surgery on the wisdom teeth possible. John Tomes's 1873 text A System of Dental Surgery describes techniques for removal of "third molars, or dentes sapientiæ" including descriptions of inferior alveolar nerve injury, jaw fracture and pupil dilation after opium is placed in the socket. Other texts from about this time speculate on their de-evolution, that they are prone to decay and discussion on whether or not they lead to crowding of the other teeth.
