= Salt rinse =

Saline solution mouthwash

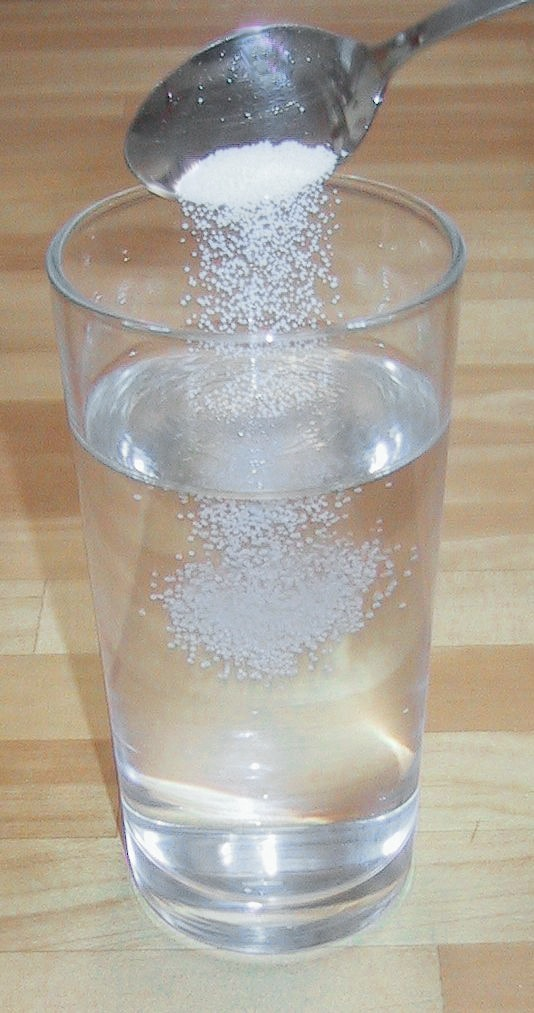

Salt rinse is a saline solution mouthwash used in dentistry to treat certain diseases and reduce post-operative pain and infection. It is also offered commercially for routine oral hygiene. Other names for the treatment include salt water mouthwash, salt water mouth bath, and saline mouth rinse.

== Preparation and Use ==
There appears to be no standard for preparation and use of a salt rinse in dentistry.

Solution. Descriptions of the solution mixture include “one level teaspoon of salt in a glass of warm water,” "about 1/2 teaspoon (2.5 milliliters) of salt in 1 cup (237 milliliters) of warm water," “one teaspoonful of common salt in a domestic tumbler.” and 0.5–1 teaspoon of table salt into a cup of water.

Temperature. "Warm," "hot,” and "a temperature as would be taken for a fresh cup of tea" (producing a solution roughly isotonic with body tissues).

Duration. "Gargle," "swish", "rinse ... for 30 seconds," and "retain each mouthful ... around the area in question for as long as it remains hot and to repeat until the entire tumblerful has been used."

Frequency. "6 times daily for 1 week, before and after every meal" (for prevention of alveolar osteitis), twice a day (general use), and "two or three times a day" (for the treatment of oral thrush).

== Efficacy ==
A 2017 review of the literature found no objective study regarding the efficacy of a warm salt solution for oral care. However, a 2015 experiment reported positive results in preventing alveolar osteitis (also called "dry socket"). While research has shown that chlorhexidine is more effective than a saline solution, where access to pharmaceuticals is limited a salt solution has the benefit of being less expensive, more readily available, and easy to produce.

A small study of a commercial sea salt rinse used for routine oral hygiene found no significant benefit in fighting plaque or gingivitis.

Gargling with salt water has been shown to reduce the incidence of upper respiratory infections, such as the common cold.

== Mechanism ==
The mechanism of salt rinse benefits, if any, remains a mystery. One hypothesis suggests the hypertonic nature of the saline solution draws out bacterial intracellular fluid by way of plasmolysis. Another that warmth induces vasodilatation, which activates phagocytes.
