= Alveolitis =

Alveolitis may refer to:

- Idiopathic pulmonary fibrosis, or fibrosing alveolitis
- Hypersensitivity pneumonitis, or allergic alveolitis
- Alveolar osteitis, or dry socket, or fibrinolytic alveolitis
