= Gigantiform cementoma =

- Specialty: Dentistry

Gigantiform cementoma is a rare, autosomal dental tumor. The tumor is benign, but without intervention can result in severe disfigurement of the jaw and facial skeleton. It is commonly found in the mandible and the maxilla but it is less commonly found in the maxilla. The tumor can be found between the premolars and the molars. The cause of this tumor is currently unknown although recent research suggests a relationship between gigantiform cementoma and Gnathodiaphyseal dysplasia (GDD). The tumor is considered rare with only a few documented cases worldwide. The most famous case is of Novemthree Siahaan (who died on September 15, 2005), an Indonesian boy from Batam Island who received medical care in Haulien, Taiwan through a Buddhist missionary from the Tzu Chi Foundation, which was documented on the Discovery Health Channel. Another famous case involves a Korean girl named Ayun Lee (August 26, 2003~) and her father Young-hak Lee which suggests that the tumor may be heritable. Lee is currently under treatment. The tumor is most prevalent in females averaging 42 years old. The condition typically affects adults between the ages of 20 and 50, with higher incidence in women than men. There is a chance to get passed down but in recent research it is said that most cases are sporadic and not inherited. The term has been used in the past to describe florid cemento-osseous dysplasia, but it is now reserved for an autosomal dominant condition affecting the maxillae. There is still not enough research to confirm whether it predominantly affects on specific group but it is a rare condition and it is not strictly associated with any one ethic group. Treatment is difficult. Surgical removal of the affected bone is needed, and has to be followed by reconstruction.

== Symptoms ==
Symptoms of Gigantiform cementoma usually occurs in the adolescent age which is from 10-19 years old, and in some cases, it may not be detected or diagnosed in later in life. It has a rapid growth of a tumor that causes the expansion of the maxilla and mandible that results in the deformity of the facial skeleton and malocclusion. A person might seek medical attention if the jaw is swollen and having pain and discomfort. The short term symptoms may be swelling in the jaw and or can cause pain due to the swelling in the jaw. A tumor growing in the jaw can cause there to be a shift in the teeth or even become loose. With a tumor growing in the jaw it can affect the nerves, specifically the trigeminal nerves. The trigeminal nerve consist of three branches, Ophthalmic (V1) nerve, Maxillary (V2) nerve and Mandibular (V3) nerve and each of these have different functions. These are important because it helps with a person to chew food and they run throughout the face. Long terms symptoms and complications over time would be similar to short term such as pain throughout the jaw, change in the alignment of the teeth. The tumor can grow very large and it can affect the appearance of the face. There is always a slight chance reoccurring can occur.

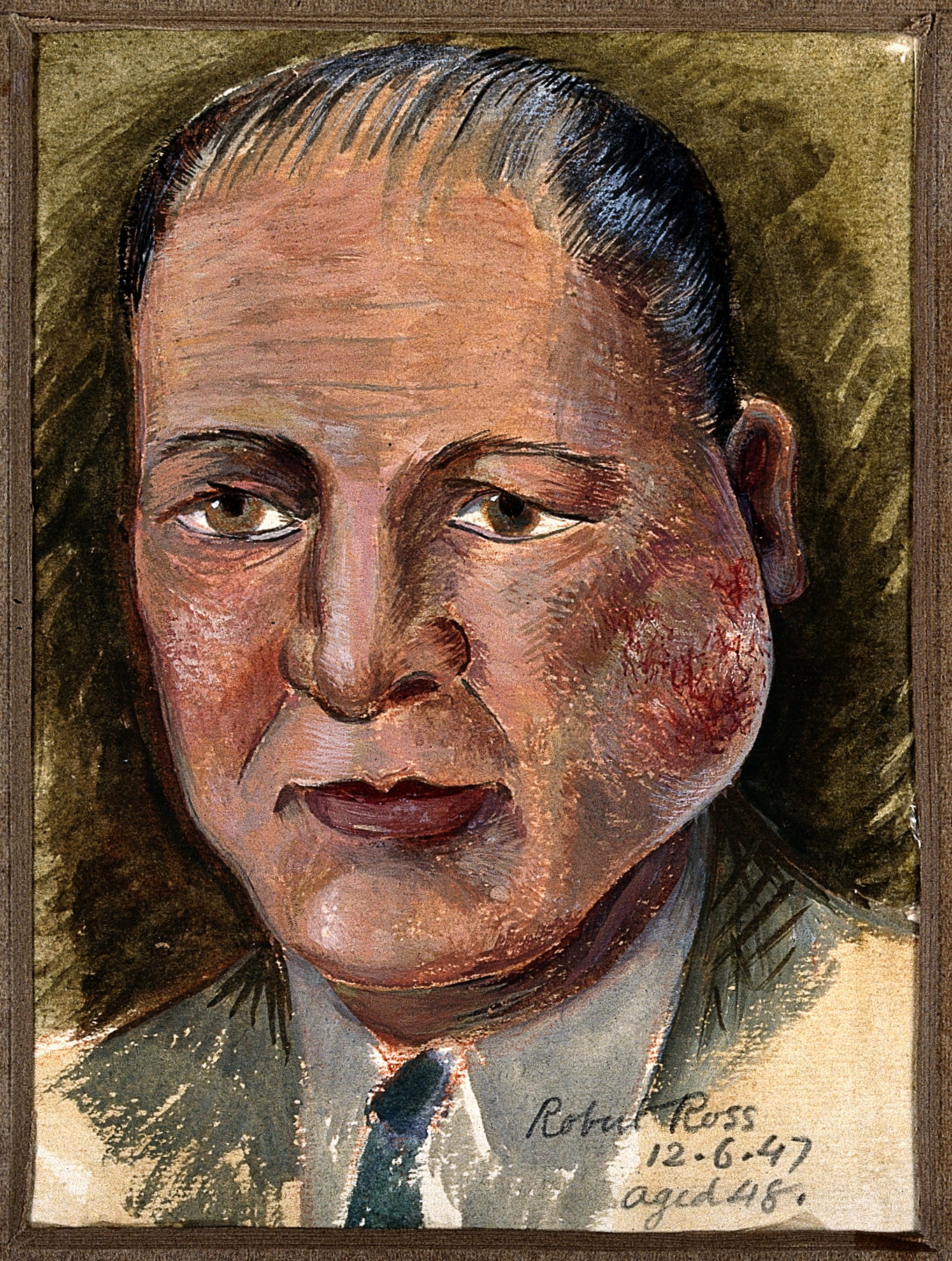
Lower jaw swollen

== Cause and Prevention ==
The cause of Gigantiform cementoma was unknown in previous years but there is a new studies that the gene ANO5 also known as TMEM16E has been linked to mutations. The ANO5 gene encodes a protein called Anoctiamin-5 which is involved with physiological processes that includes ion channel regulation and cell signaling. With the new research there can be genetic testing done for diagnosis. This can help with early detection, close monitoring and treatment plan. There is only a handful of documented cases worldwide. It is an autosomal dominant genetic disorder meaning both females and male are able to develop the tumor. There is a higher incidence in women than men.

== Pathophysiology/ Mechanism ==
The rare benign tumor is an autosomal dominant disorder and there are some cases that are sporadic having no family history with the disorder, meaning it can be due to a spontaneous mutation. But there are some cases where the parent passed down the disorder, it is just a slight chance that it can occur. It is classified as a benign fibro-osseous lesion of the jaw, which means it contains both fibrous tissue and bone like structures. The tumor is a slow growing lesion that can cause the maxilla and the mandible to expand causing a shift in the teeth. There is an inflammatory response due to the tumor leading to discomfort and pain of the jaw. The tumor also affects the growth of the jaw. In early adolescent years the tumor can go undetected because the tumor cannot cause complications until it has grown at a large size. The tumor affects the jaw, which is more commonly found in the mandible and there has been hardly any cases with the maxillary but it can still happen.

== Diagnosis ==
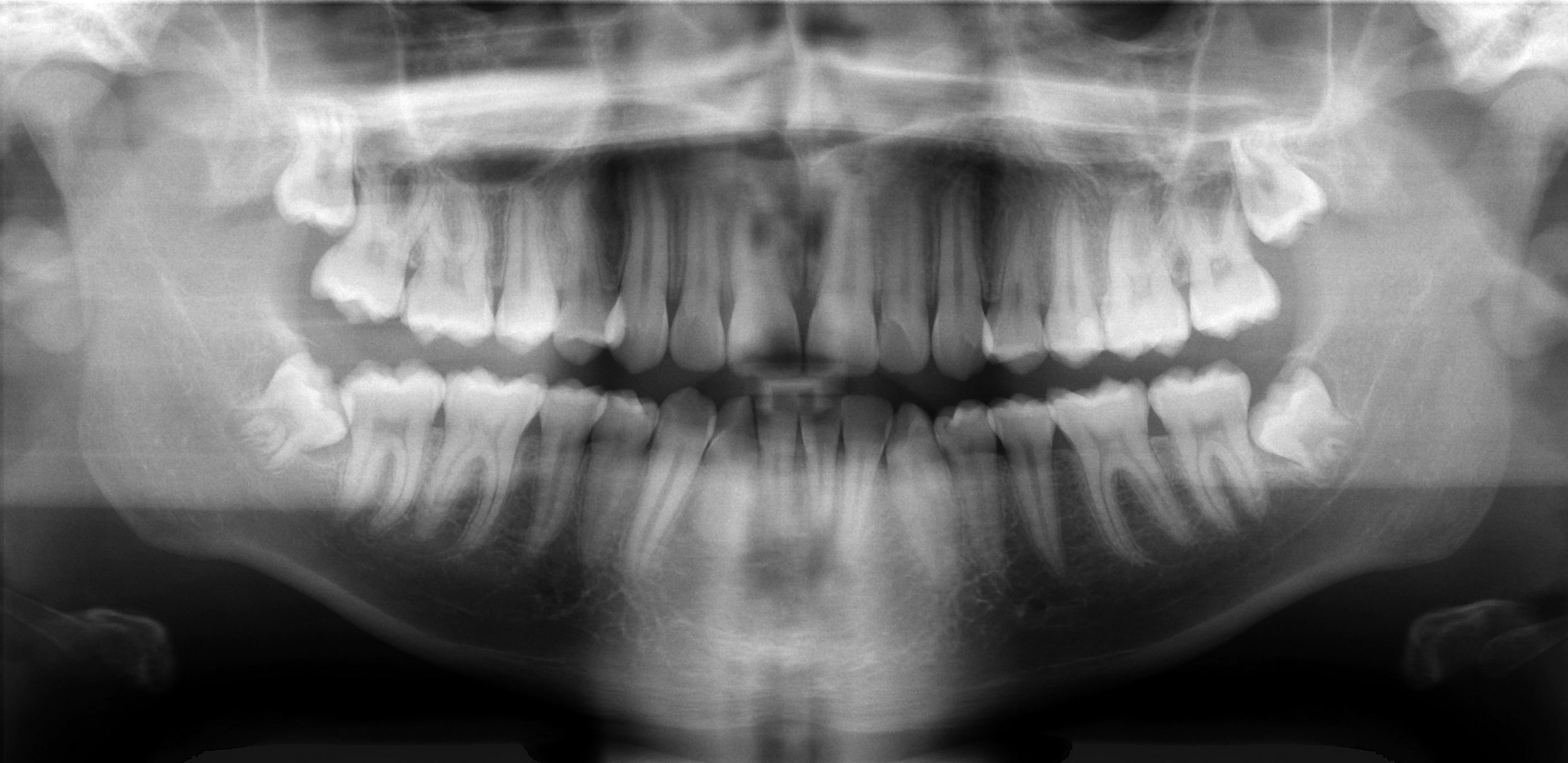
Panoramic X-ray with a view of the jaw and teeth

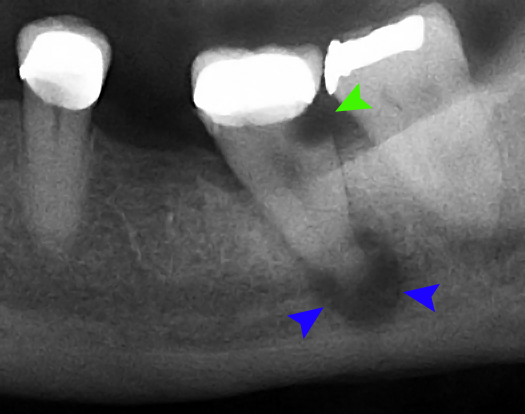
Cone Beam Computed Tomography (CBCT) gives a 3D view of the jaw and of a specific area

Once a person is having symptoms related to Gigantiform cementoma it is suggest to seek medical attention. The health providers that can help would be a Dentist, Oral Surgeon, Oral Pathologist, and Prosthodontist. A dentist can do an exam and take x-rays to evaluate symptoms and to be able to refer the patient to the correct specialist. An Oral Surgeon are specialized with surgical procedures related to the mouth, jaw and the face. An Oral Pathologist is able to help with diagnosis by examining the tissues samples in order to diagnosis and treat diseases related the jaw, and mouth. Prosthodontist are able to aid with the missing teeth. The doctors specialize with dental prosthetics. In order to diagnosis a patient with Gigantiform cementom there has to be X-ray done that provides the doctor with the view of the jaw and the teeth to identify the tumor and to also be able to see the size of the tumor. There are different types of X-rays that can be done which are the Panoramic Radiograph and Cone Beam Computed Tomography (CBCT). Biopsy may be suggested by an Oral Surgeon to be able to collect tissues from the tumor to get samples for histological examine, this is necessary to confirm diagnosis. Blood test can also be done to confirm diagnosis.

== Treatment ==
The recommend treatment for Gigantiform cementoma is surgery and reconstruction of the jaw. The surgery will remove the tumor, the affected bone and teeth which is then followed by reconstruction of the jaw. Gigantiform cementoma affects the jaw and has a rapid growth and can be found in multiple quadrants and has high reoccurring rates. Therefore the goal for treatment is to be able to reset the lesion, preserve the jaw and help restore its function, reduce complications and simply to improve/maintain the patients quality of life. The reconstruction is necessary after the surgery which involves the implant and virtual surgical planning. It is also important to know that it is a rare, benign tumor and it has high reoccurring rates.

== Prognosis ==
The tumor occurs in 3 stages. At the age between 11 and 13 is the range of age where people tend to develop the tumor. By the age 16 the tumor has expanded quickly and there's growth suppression around the age 18-20 years of age. There has been a handful amount of cases that have been reported. There is a slight chance it can be inherited because it is an autosomal disorder which means that a single copy of the mutant allele is present. Both females and males can both can be equally affected but there is a higher chance of occurring in females. It is possible for recurrence because during the skeletal growth of lesions are more cellular and biologically active and it has high chances of recurring even after surgery. It is a benign tumor which does not pose a direct threat to a patient's life but it all depends on the size of it. In the beginning it is not that big and it should not bother the patient but it does expand rapidly and it will start to bother the patient. It will start to feel the swelling around the jaw and the teeth will shift. Life for young adolescents will be difficult with these changes that can grow fast and big in a short period of time. Since there are not a lot of cases more information on prognosis is limited.

== Epidemiology ==
As stated before this is a rare tumor that the epidemiology reflects the rarity of it. There if only a handful of cases and some of them have been discovered by accident during dental exams. The ages ranges from early childhood to early adulthood which most cases ranged from 10 to 50 years of age with a mean of 42 years old. This can be seen more in females than males but this does not mean it cannot affect males at well. There is no strong link with any specific ethnicity or race. There has been more sporadic cases than familial cases, but it does not mean it can not be passed down. The gigantiform cementoma typically affects the mandible compares to the maxilla and causes a significant jaw expansion which can be involved in multiple quadrants of the jaw. There has been high recurrence rates because there is a rapid expansion of the tumor which can cause a difficult surgery when trying to remove it. If the surgeons are not able to completely remove the tumor it will cause reoccurrence and a rapid regrowth of the tumor. It has used to bean unknown rare autosomal genetic disease. But in recent studies there has been a link with the ANO5 mutations.

== Research Directions ==
Recent research has shown a link between the ANO5 gene and Gigantiform cementoma. The ANO5 gene is involved in various physiological process such as ion channel regulation and cell signalling. This is potentially exciting news because now there may be a link to the gene, possibly allowing for genetic testing and early diagnosis, which can identify patients who are at risk before symptoms worsen. Scientists may be able to do research on how the ANO5 gene works to be able to target directly the gene mutation or research treatment options. This represents an early understanding regarding the sporadic cases that occur around the world. Gigantiform cementoma was first discovered during the 1930s, and in 2023 there has been research on how it can be linked to the ANO5 gene.
