= Coronectomy =

Removal of the crown of a tooth

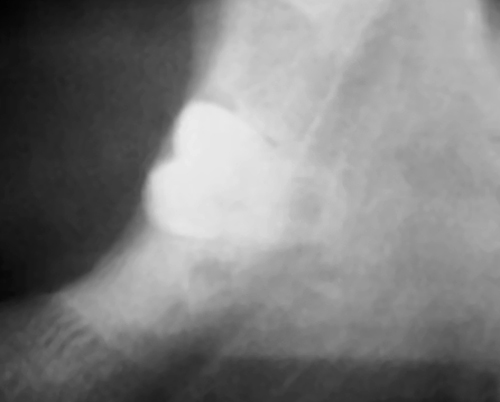
Wisdom tooth with close association to the inferior alveolar nerve.

When extracting lower wisdom teeth, coronectomy is a treatment option involving removing the crown of the lower wisdom tooth, whilst keeping the roots in place in healthy patients. This option is given to patients as an alternative to extraction when the wisdom teeth are in close association with the inferior alveolar nerve, and so used to prevent damage to the nerve which may occur during extraction.

== Advantages ==
Reduces risk of neuropathy compared with full extraction.

The risk of altered sensation is significantly lower than convention surgical removal of mandibular third molars. Approximately 0.65% of individuals encounter postoperative deficits in the Inferior alveolar nerve (IAN) following coronectomy, a significantly lower occurrence compared to the 5.10% observed after conventional extraction procedures. Patients undergoing coronectomy are anticipated to experience easier recovery from IAN deficits compared to those undergoing extractions. Limited studies indicate a 100% recovery rate in coronectomy patients, whereas only 66% of patients undergoing extraction recover within one month. 62.2% of the roots will migrate post-coronectomy, erupting away from the inferior alveolar canal. This makes extraction of the remaining roots safer.

== Disadvantages ==
There is a 5% chance of failure of coronectomy, the root will become mobilized during transection. In 5% of the cases, follicle remnants will form deep periodontal pockets which will lead to infection.

== Indications ==
Coronectomy should be considered if there are signs that the patient is at a high risk of nerve damage during extraction:

- Lower wisdom tooth is shown to be close to the inferior alveolar canal radiographically:
  - Signs of narrowing or diversion of the canal
  - Roots are darkened / canal is interrupted
  - Interruption of lamina dura
  - Juxta-apical region on the radiograph
- Not medically compromised
- Tooth vital, caries/pathology free and non-mobile

== Contraindications ==
- Non-vital tooth
- Tooth is mobile or becomes mobile during procedure
- Tooth is horizontal or distoangular impacted
- Medically compromised patients for example immunocompromised
- Patients who are predisposed to local infection for example if they have undergone radiotherapy in the area they may have poor healing.
- Caries or persistent infection

== Procedure ==
=== Preoperative assessment ===
==== The patient ====
The patient should be aware of the potential risks of the procedure such as:

- Dry socket
- Secondary surgical procedures

==== Radiography ====
A plain film radiograph allows the proximity of the tooth to the inferior alveolar canal to be assessed. The plain film can be assessed to identify the tooth as high risk If there is; loss of the lamina dura, darkening of the canal and grooving of the root. If the mandibular third molar is deemed to be high risk, a cone beam CT (CBCT) is taken in addition to the plain film. The justification of additional radiography can be justified by the surgeon as it allows them to gain further information regarding the tooth roots and the inferior alveolar canal should the roots be mobilised when transecting.

==== Consent ====
Verbal consent must be attained by the surgeon prior to the procedure of a coronectomy. Additionally consent must be gained if removal of the roots is required due to mobilisation. The patient should be informed of early and late infection meaning the roots may need removing.

=== Operative technique ===
1. Long buccal infiltration and anterior buccal infiltration both with 4% articaine, 1:10000ppm of epinephrine. This can be supplemented with an inferior dental block using 2% lidocaine, 1:80000 epinephrine.
2. The third molar is exposed by raising a buccal triangular mucoperiosteal fold thickness flap.
3. A fissure bur is used to create a buccal gutter of bone and to expose the ACJ.
4. Drill directly into pulp at intersection of buccal groove and ACJ.
5. This cut is lateralised to create a horizontal groove below the level of the ACJ.
6. The crown can be fractured off the roots using a small elevator such as coupland number 1 or straight Warwick James.
7. Care must be taken to not apply too much torque to the tooth so minimising root mobilisation.
8. Use a rose head bur to remove enamel fragments.
9. Remaining roots should sit a few millimeters below the alveolar crestal bone level, where the pulp should not be touched.
10. Then follow up with closing the area and suturing.
11. Post operative chlorohexidine mouth wash or gel can be prescribed, however antibiotics should not be prescribed unless there is pericoronal infection.

=== Post operative complications ===
==== Early ====
If the patient presents with dry socket, irrigate with chlorohexidine mouthwash and place resorbable dressing such as Alvogyl. If the patient has recurrent infection, consideration to remove the roots should be noted.

==== Late ====
In a few cases the remaining roots may erupt which can minimise the morbidity of the inferior alveolar nerve, however the roots may be in close contact to the inferior alveolar nerve requiring surgical separation.
