= Lee Young-hak =

Murderer on death row in South Korea

Lee Young-hak (Korean: 이영학, born 26 July 1982) is a criminal from South Korea.

== Biography ==
Born in Yeongju, South Gyeongsang Province, He was raised in Uijeongbu, Gyeonggi Province. He is one of only a handful of patients ever recorded to be suffering from Gigantiform cementoma. His daughter, Ayun Lee, also has the condition, which has led scientists to believe that there may be a hereditary component to the disease. The father and daughter pair are the only known cases in Korea.

Because the surgery to remove the tumors left Lee with only his molars, he became known as "Molar Daddy" and his story was publicized in mass media. He also penned a book called Molar Daddy's Happiness.

== Crimes ==
On 5 September 2017 his wife, Choe Mi-sun, died. It became controversial whether she killed herself or was murdered. However, stories emerged that Choe was forced into prostitution by her husband and had been repeatedly raped by her father-in-law.

On October 1, 2017, he molested his 14 year old daughter A-yun's friend with the assistance of his daughter after drugging the friend. When the friend woke up in the house, Young-hak strangled her to death. He later disposed her body in the mountains, with help from A-yun.

The case has shocked the public because the suspect had been depicted as a loving and caring father by the media since 2006. He appeared on TV several times, appealing to the public for donations to treat his daughter, who suffered from the same rare dental tumor he did.

In contrast to his carefully crafted public persona, numerous media reports have emerged containing potential evidence and testimonies that hint at his alleged lavish lifestyle, obsession with gas stations and distorted sexual desire toward owls.

== Books ==
- Molar Daddy's Happiness (2007)
