= Wisdom tooth =

Large tooth at the back of the human mouth

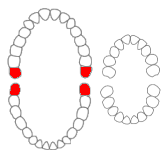
- Third molars are present among permanent teeth. There are none in deciduous (children's) teeth.

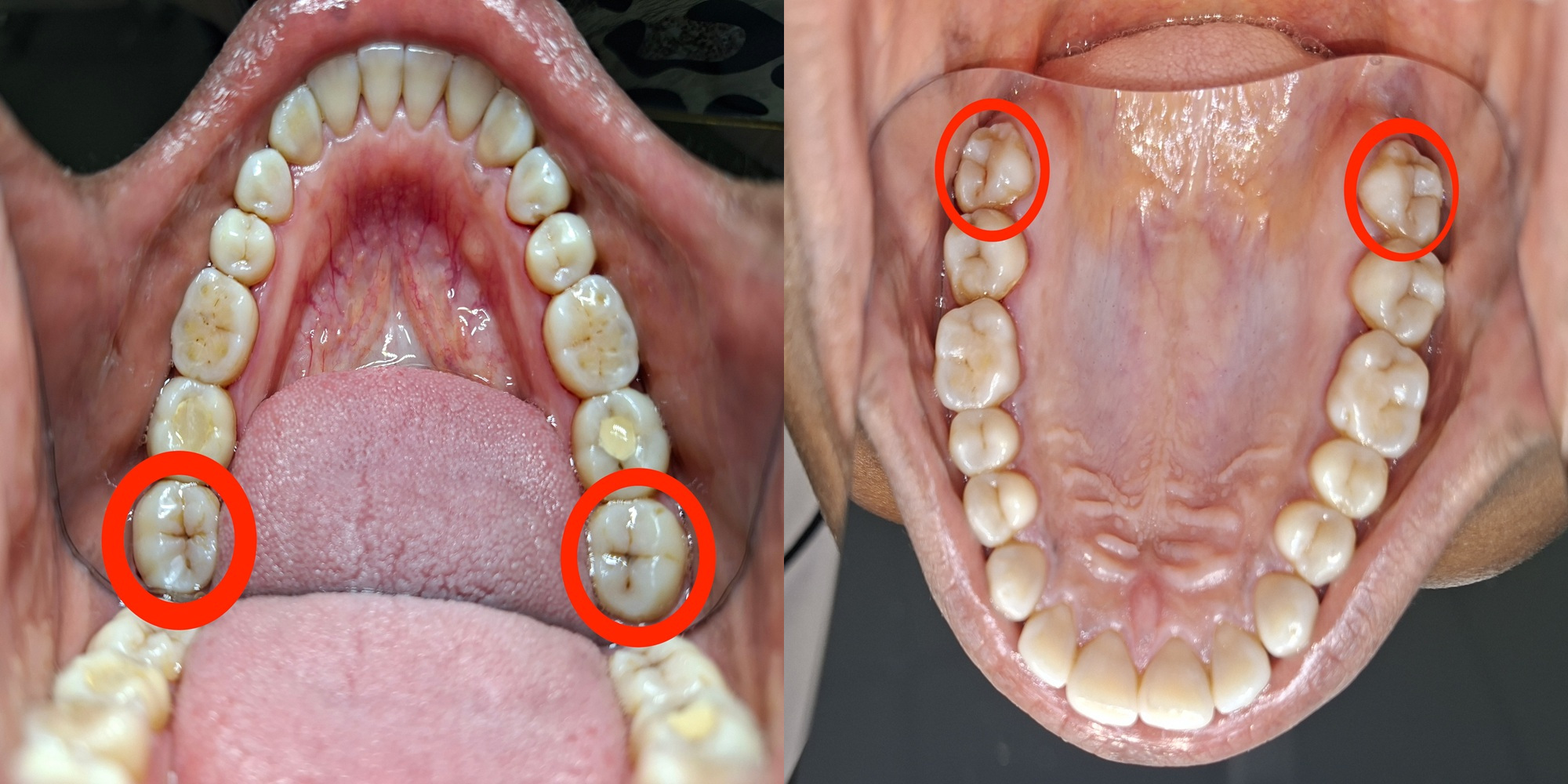
- Wisdom teeth

Identifiers
- MeSH: D008964
- TA98: A05.1.03.008
- TA2: 911
- FMA: 321612

The third molar, commonly called wisdom tooth, is the most posterior of the three molars in each quadrant of the human dentition. The age at which wisdom teeth come through (erupt) is variable, but this generally occurs between late teens and early twenties. Most adults have four wisdom teeth, one in each of the four quadrants, but it is possible to have none, fewer, or more, in which case the extras are called supernumerary teeth. Wisdom teeth may become stuck (impacted) and not erupt fully, if there is not enough space for them to erupt normally. Impacted wisdom teeth are still sometimes removed for orthodontic treatment, believing that they move the other teeth and cause crowding, though this is disputed.

Impacted wisdom teeth may suffer from tooth decay if oral hygiene becomes more difficult. Wisdom teeth that are partially erupted through the gum may also cause inflammation with infection in the surrounding gum tissues, termed pericoronitis. More conservative treatments, such as operculectomies, may be appropriate for some cases. However, impacted wisdom teeth are commonly extracted to treat or prevent these problems. Some authorities oppose the prophylactic removal of disease-free impacted wisdom teeth, including the National Institute for Health and Care Excellence in the UK.

== History ==
Although formally known as third molars, the common name is wisdom teeth because they appear so late – much later than the other teeth, at an age where people are presumably "wiser" than as a child, when the other teeth erupt. The term probably came as a translation of the Latin dens sapientiae. Their eruption has been known for millennia to cause dental issues; it was noted at least as far back as Aristotle:

The last teeth to come in man are molars called 'wisdom-teeth', which come at the age of twenty years, in the case of both sexes. Cases have been known in women upwards of eighty years old where at the very close of life the wisdom-teeth have come up, causing great pain in their coming; and cases have been known of the like phenomenon in men too. This happens, when it does happen, in the case of people where the wisdom-teeth have not come up in early years.

— Aristotle, The History of Animals

The oldest known impacted wisdom tooth belonged to a European woman who lived between 13,000 and 11,000 BCE, in the Magdalenian period. Nonetheless, molar impaction was relatively rare prior to the modern era. With the Industrial Revolution, the affliction became ten times more common, owing to the new prevalence of soft, processed foods.

== Structure ==
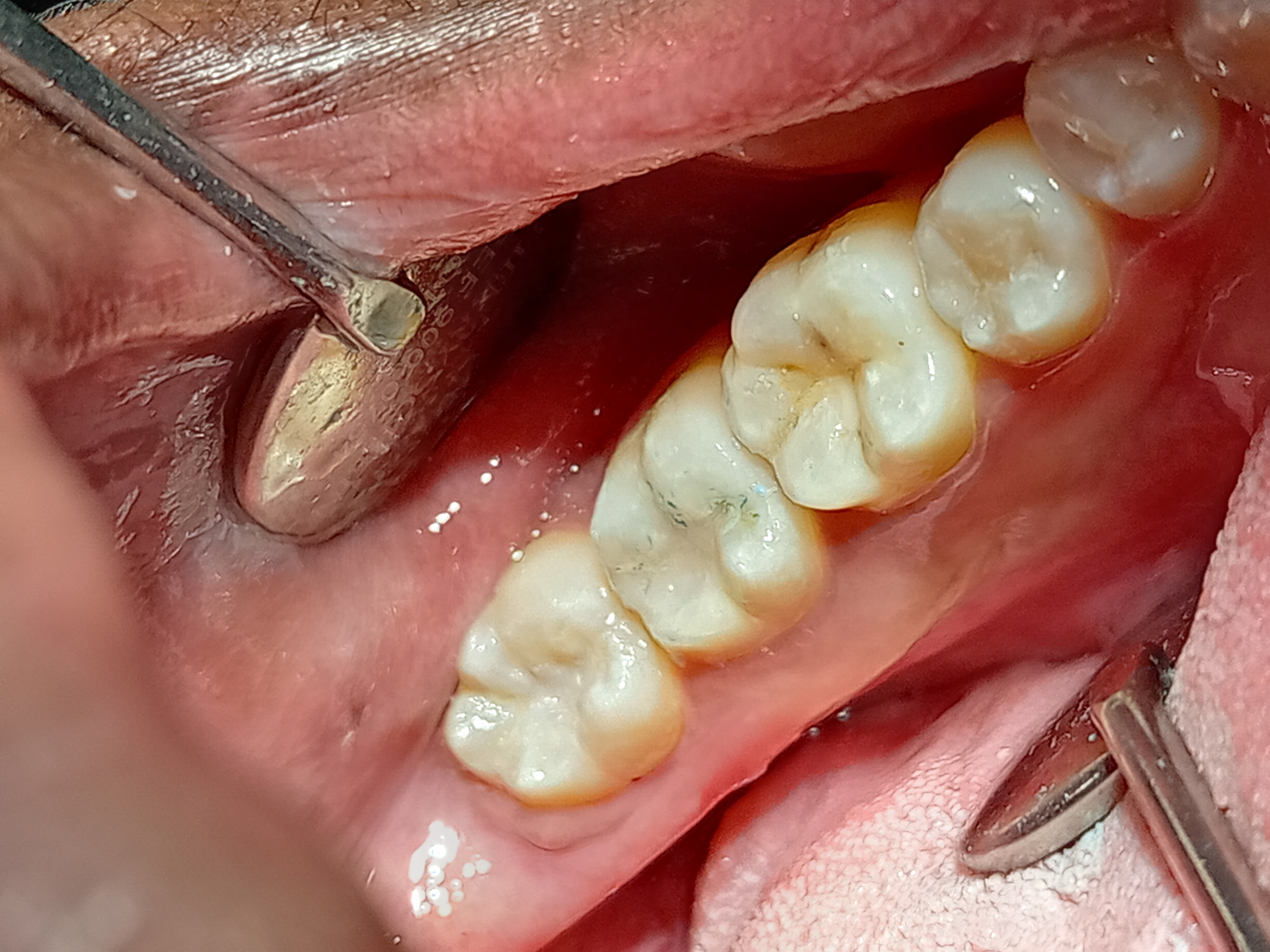
Bottom left premolars and adult molars, including a healthy and ideally erupted wisdom tooth

=== Tooth morphology ===
The morphology of wisdom teeth can be variable.

Maxillary (upper) third molars commonly have a triangular crown with a deep central fossa from which multiple irregular fissures originate. Their roots are commonly fused together and can be irregular in shape.

Mandibular (lower) third molars are the smallest molar teeth in the permanent dentition. The crown usually takes on a rounded rectangular shape that features four or five cusps with an irregular fissure pattern. Roots are greatly reduced in size and can be fused together.

=== Dental notation ===
There are several notation systems used in dentistry to identify teeth. Under the Palmer/Zsigmondy system, the right and left maxillary wisdom teeth are represented by ^{8}⏌ and ⎿^{8}, while _{8}⏋ and ⎾_{8} represent the right and left mandibular wisdom teeth. Under the FDI notational system, the right and left maxillary third molars are numbered 18 and 28, respectively, and the right and left mandibular third molars are numbered 48 and 38. According to the Universal Numbering System the right and left upper wisdom teeth are numbered 1 and 16 and the right and left lower wisdom teeth are 32 and 17.

=== Variation ===
Agenesis of wisdom teeth differs by population, ranging from practically zero in Aboriginal Tasmanians to nearly 100% in indigenous Mexicans. The difference is related to the PAX9 and MSX1 genes (and perhaps other genes).

=== Age of eruption ===
There is significant variation between the reported age of eruption of wisdom teeth between different populations. For example, wisdom teeth tend to erupt earlier in people with African heritage compared to people of Asian and European heritage.

Generally, wisdom teeth erupt most commonly between ages 17 and 21. Eruption may start as early as age 13 in some groups and typically occurs before the age of 25. If they have not erupted by age 25, oral surgeons generally consider that the tooth will not erupt spontaneously.

Root development can continue for up to three years after eruption occurs.

== Function ==
Anthropologists believe human and other primate wisdom teeth may help with chewing tougher foods. After the advent of agriculture over 10,000 years ago, and especially with the industrial revolution in recent centuries, soft human diets became more common through the use of tools (cutting the food) and cooking to make food easier to chew. Compared to hunter-gatherer populations, post-industrial agriculturalist populations are thought to encounter less masticatory stress and consequently have shorter and wider mandibles, predisposing them to dental crowding and malocclusion.

== Clinical significance ==
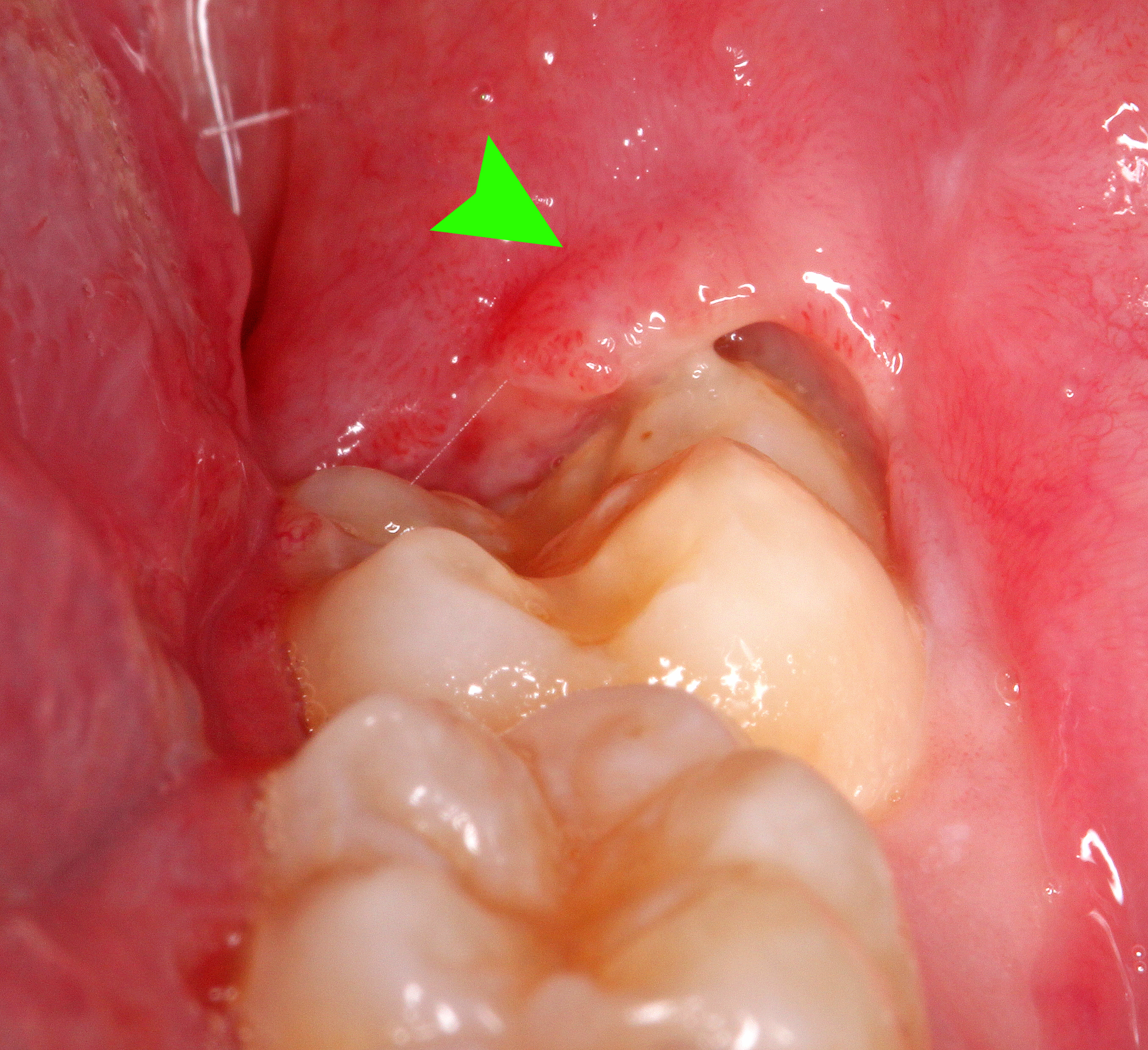
Inflamed excess gum flap (inflamed operculum marked by green arrow) over wisdom tooth

Wisdom teeth (often notated clinically as M3 for the third molar) have long been identified as a source of problems and continue to be the most commonly impacted teeth in the human mouth. Impaction of the wisdom teeth results in a risk of periodontal disease and dental cavities. Impacted wisdom teeth lead to pathology in 12% of cases.

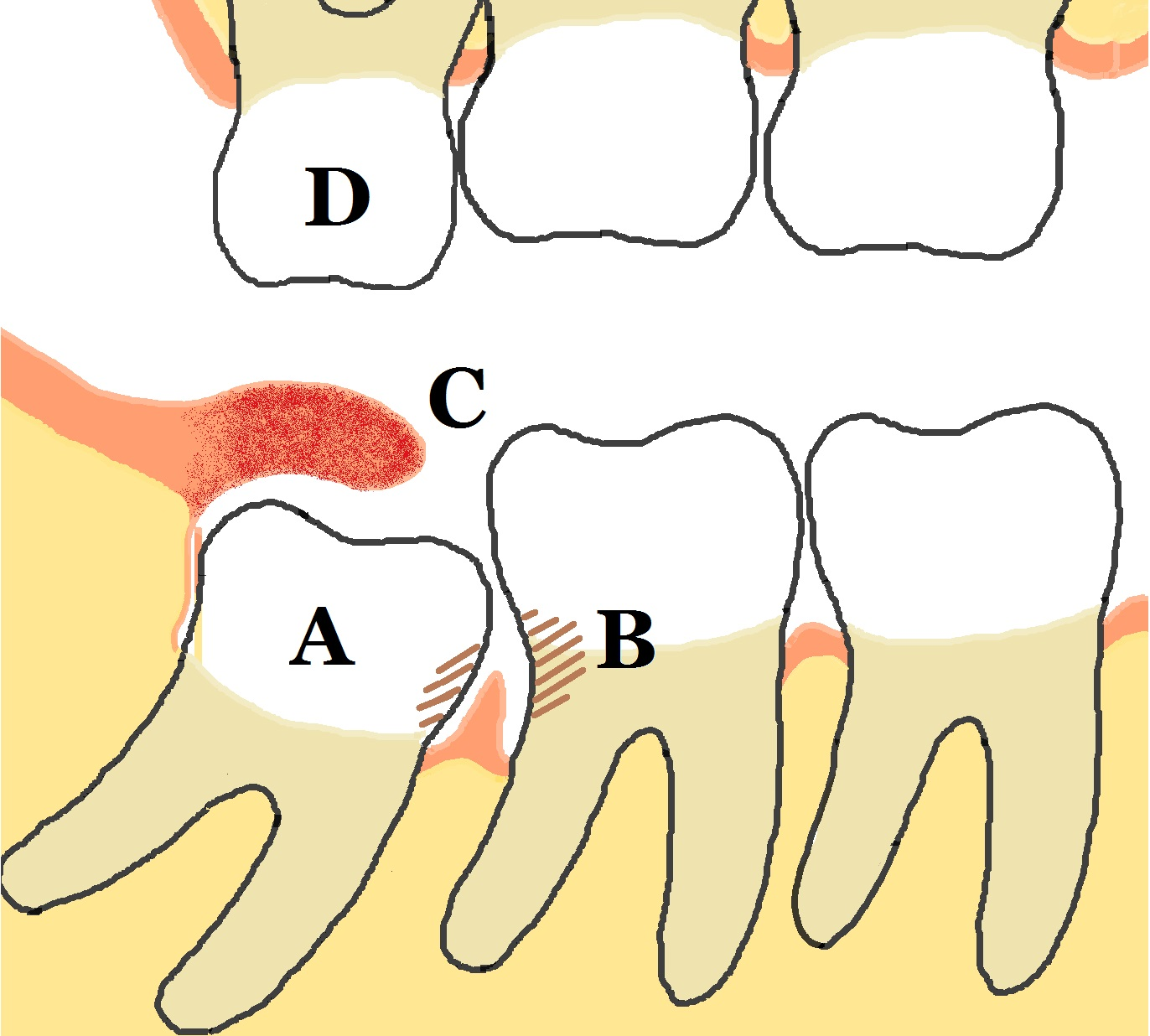
Some problems which may or may not occur with third molars: A Mesio-impacted, partially erupted mandibular third molar, B Dental caries and periodontal defects associated with both the third and second molars, caused by food packing and poor access to oral hygiene methods, C Inflamed operculum covering partially erupted lower third molar, with accumulation of food debris and bacteria underneath, D The upper third molar has over-erupted due to lack of opposing tooth contact, and may start to occlude into the operculum over the lower third molar traumatically. Unopposed teeth are usually sharp because another tooth has not blunted them.

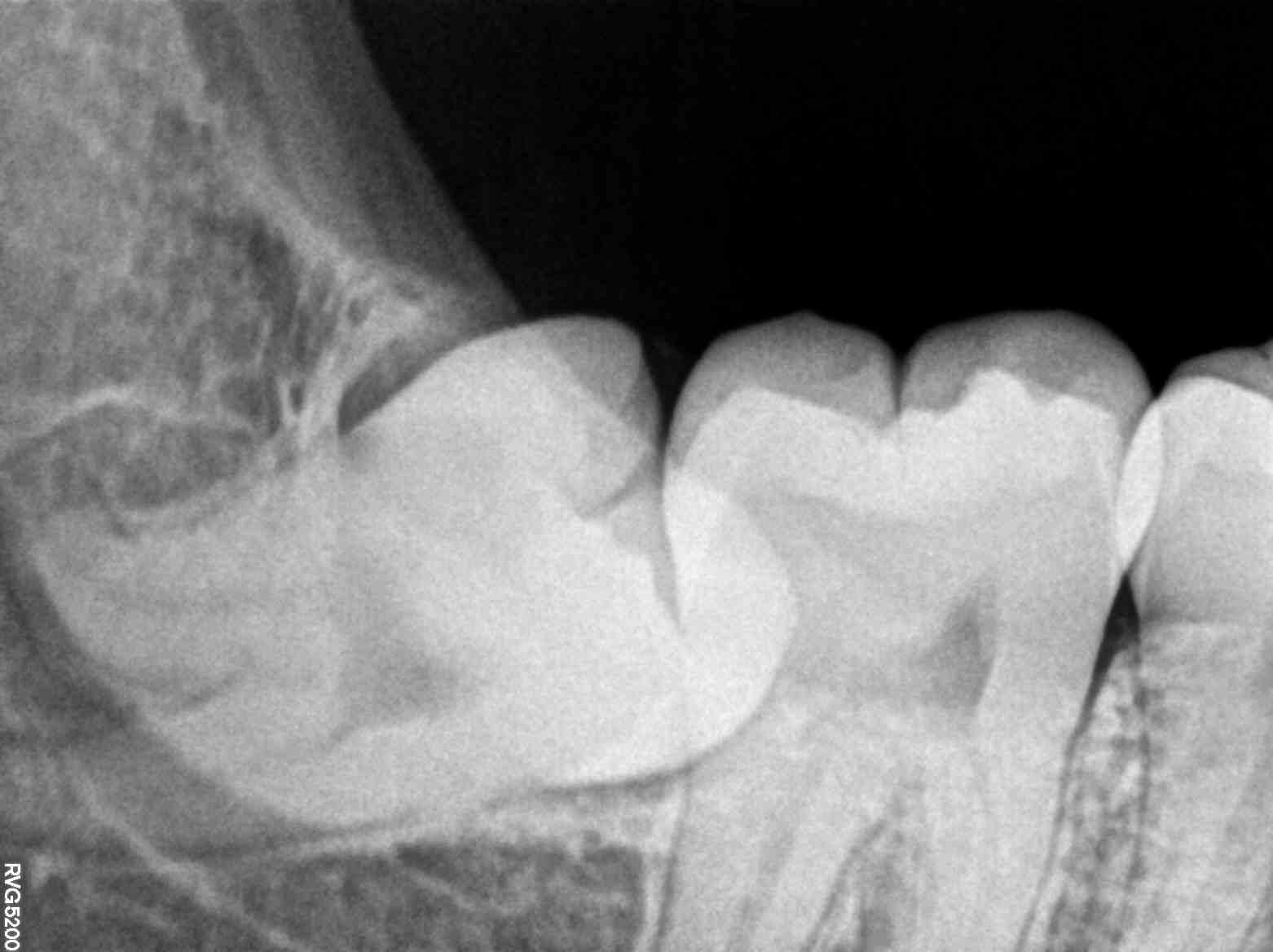
Dental x-ray of impacted lower left wisdom tooth with a horizontal orientation

Impacted wisdom teeth are classified by the direction and depth of impaction, the amount of available space for tooth eruption and the amount of soft tissue or bone that covers them. The classification structure allows clinicians to estimate the probabilities of impaction, infections and complications associated with wisdom teeth removal. Wisdom teeth are also classified by the presence of symptoms and disease.

Treatment of an erupted wisdom tooth is the same as any other tooth in the mouth. If impacted and having a pathology, such as caries or pericoronitis, treatment can be dental restoration for cavities and for pericoronitis, salt water rinses, local treatment to the infected tissue overlying the impaction, oral antibiotics, surgical removal of excess gum flap (operculectomy), or if those failed, extraction or coronectomy.

The National Health Service in the UK recommends people go to dental check-ups every 3–24 months, depending on the state of the teeth and gums and the recommendation of the dentist.

=== Common pathologies associated with wisdom teeth ===
Odontogenic infections are a dental complication originating inside the tooth or near the surrounding tissues. Different types of odontogenic infections may affect impacted wisdom teeth, such as periodontitis, pulpitis, dental abscess, and pericoronitis.

Pericoronitis is a common pathology of impacted third molar. It is an acute localized infection of the tissue surrounding the impacted wisdom teeth. Clinically the tissue appears to be red, tender to touch and edematous. The common symptoms the patient reports are pain 'that ranges from dull to throbbing to intense' and often radiates to mouth, ear, or floor of the mouth. Moreover, swelling of the cheek, halitosis and trismus can occur.

=== Odontogenic cysts ===
Odontogenic cysts are a less common pathology of the impacted wisdom tooth with some estimates of prevalence from 0.64% to 2.24% of impacted wisdom teeth. They are described as 'cavities filled with liquid, semiliquid or gaseous content with odontogenic epithelial lining and connective tissue on the outside'. However, studies have found cysts to be prevalent in a small percentage of impacted wisdom teeth that are extracted. The most common types associated with impacted third molars are radicular cysts, dentigerous cysts and odontogenic keratocysts. Large cysts take 2–13 years to develop.

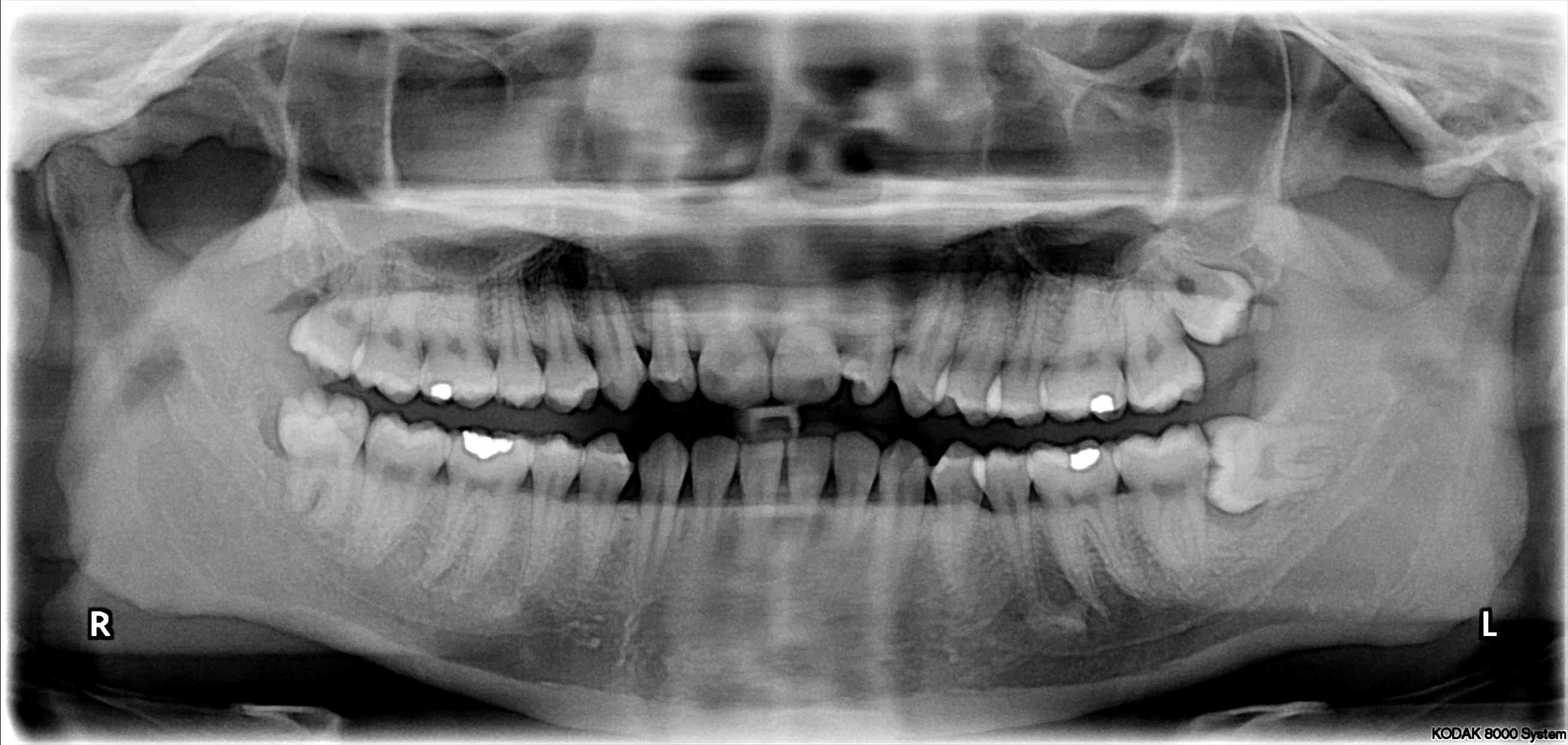
The upper left (picture right) and upper right (picture left) wisdom teeth are distoangularly impacted. The lower left wisdom tooth is horizontally impacted. The lower right wisdom tooth is vertically impacted (unidentifiable in orthopantomogram).

=== Oral hygiene care ===
Practice and maintenance of good oral hygiene can help prevent and control some wisdom tooth pathologies. In addition to twice daily toothbrushing, interdental cleaning is recommended to ensure plaque build doesn't occur in interdental areas. There are various products available for this – dental floss and interdental brushes being the most common.

=== Removal of impacted wisdom teeth ===
Removal of asymptomatic impacted wisdom teeth with the absence of disease and no evidence of local infection as a prophylactic method has been disputed within the dental community for a long time. There is insufficient reliable scientific evidence for dental health professionals and policymakers to determine if asymptomatic, disease-free impacted wisdom teeth should be removed. Therefore, the decision will depend on a combination of clinical expertise and patient preference. If the tooth is retained, regular check-ups to identify any problems that may occur are recommended. Considering the lack of quality evidence at present, more long-term studies need to be undertaken to obtain a reliable scientific conclusion.

=== United States ===
In 2024, a survey found that 53% of Americans had undergone wisdom teeth removal, with a lower rate of 26% among those aged 18–29. The lower prevalence among younger adults may reflect the shorter time for wisdom teeth to develop complications, as well as a shift in dental practice since the early 2000s, with some professionals questioning the necessity of routine extractions.

=== Mandibular third molar surgery recovery ===
Platelet-rich fibrin (PRF) is a postoperative method used to heal the alveolar socket following the removal of the mandibular third molar. PRF is a second-generation result of the isolation of platelets, white blood cells, stem cells, and growth factors from blood samples. Studies have shown that when used there are improvements in pain sensations, swelling and a decreased risk of developing dry socket. This method was shown only to reduce symptoms and is not completely preventive. To date, there is no clear correlation between the use of PRF after a mandibular third molar removal surgery and the recovery of jaw spasms, bone restoration, and soft tissue healing. Further studies with larger study samples are needed to validate current theories.

=== Prognosis ===
About a third of symptomatic unerupted wisdom teeth have been shown to erupt and be non-functional or non-hygienic partially. Studies have also shown that 30% to 60% of people with previously asymptomatic impacted wisdom teeth will have an extraction of at least one of them in 4 to 12 years from diagnosis.

=== Risk factors of inferior alveolar nerve damage ===
Temporary and permanent inferior alveolar nerve (IAN) damage is a known complication of the surgical removal of impacted lower third molars, happening in 1 in 85 patients and 1 in 300 extractions, respectively. Studies have shown that certain risk factors may increase the likelihood of IAN damage. Proximity of the impacted third molar root to the mandibular canal, which can be seen in radiographs, has been shown to be a high-risk factor for IAN damage. Alongside this, the depth of impaction of the tooth, surgical technique and surgeons experience are all contributing risk factors for IAN damage during this procedure. Careful case-by-case consideration is crucial to avoid this risk.

=== Lower anterior teeth crowding ===
Lower anterior teeth crowding has been a common discussion among the orthodontic community for decades. In the 1970s, it was thought that unerupted wisdom teeth produced a forward-directed force that would cause crowding of the anterior segment. Recent research has shown that there is no agreed opinion and that the cause is due to a variety of factors. This includes dental factors, such as tooth crown size and primary tooth loss, and skeletal factors, which include growth of the maxilla and mandible and the presence of malocclusions. General factors include the age and sex of the patient. Overall, recent research has suggested that wisdom teeth alone do not cause crowding of teeth.

== See also ==
- Dental anthropology
- Molar (tooth)
- Dental anatomy
- Impacted wisdom teeth
- Human evolution
- Oral and maxillofacial surgery
