= Novemthree Siahaan =

Indonesian sufferer of rare medical condition

Novemthree Siahaan (3 November 1998 – 14 September 2005) was an Indonesian boy who had the rare condition gigantiform cementoma. According to the Financial Times, he had "the largest recorded facial tumour". The story of his life garnered much media attention when he was taken to Taiwan for treatment. His surgeries were filmed for international broadcast on the Discovery Health Channel. Siahaan was from Batam Island, Indonesia.

== Media ==
Novemthree's story was shared on the Discovery Health Channel in 2005. Channel 5 covered Siahaan in a story titled "Extraordinary People: The Boy with a Tumour for a Face". He was profiled by the BBC.

Novemthree's condition was brought to the attention of David Liu, a missionary for the Tzu Chi Foundation in Taiwan. Seeing the seriousness of the boys tumor growths, Liu arranged for Novemthree and his father to be flown to Tzu Chi to begin treatments in early 2003. After four painful operations, Novemthree's face was reconstructed to resemble that of a normal boy. After learning how to talk, walk and eat, he and his father returned home in summer. It was originally felt that surgeries every year or two would keep the tumors manageable until Novemthree was grown and bone grafts could be performed. A year later, Novemthree's tumors had grown back at an alarming rate and his breathing became restricted. Doctors brought him back to Tzu Chi where it was decided that a permanent tracheotomy would be required which would be difficult to maintain in the unsanitary conditions of his village. Novemthree would require more painful operations which would result in facial skin dying and his appearance once again would become distorted. His mother returned with him to Batam to give consideration of this with his dad. A few weeks later as his mother was bringing him breakfast she discovered he died early on September 15, 2005. Tzu Chi paid for his burial.

Since Novemthree's death, his parents gave birth to two more sons. They and his brother Saut did not develop the same illness that plagued their oldest sibling. The family of five still live in the same impoverished apartment in Batam. Novemthree's pink panther doll still hangs in the room he used to sleep in with brother Saut.
