= Tooth impaction =

Prevention of tooth eruption by a physical barrier

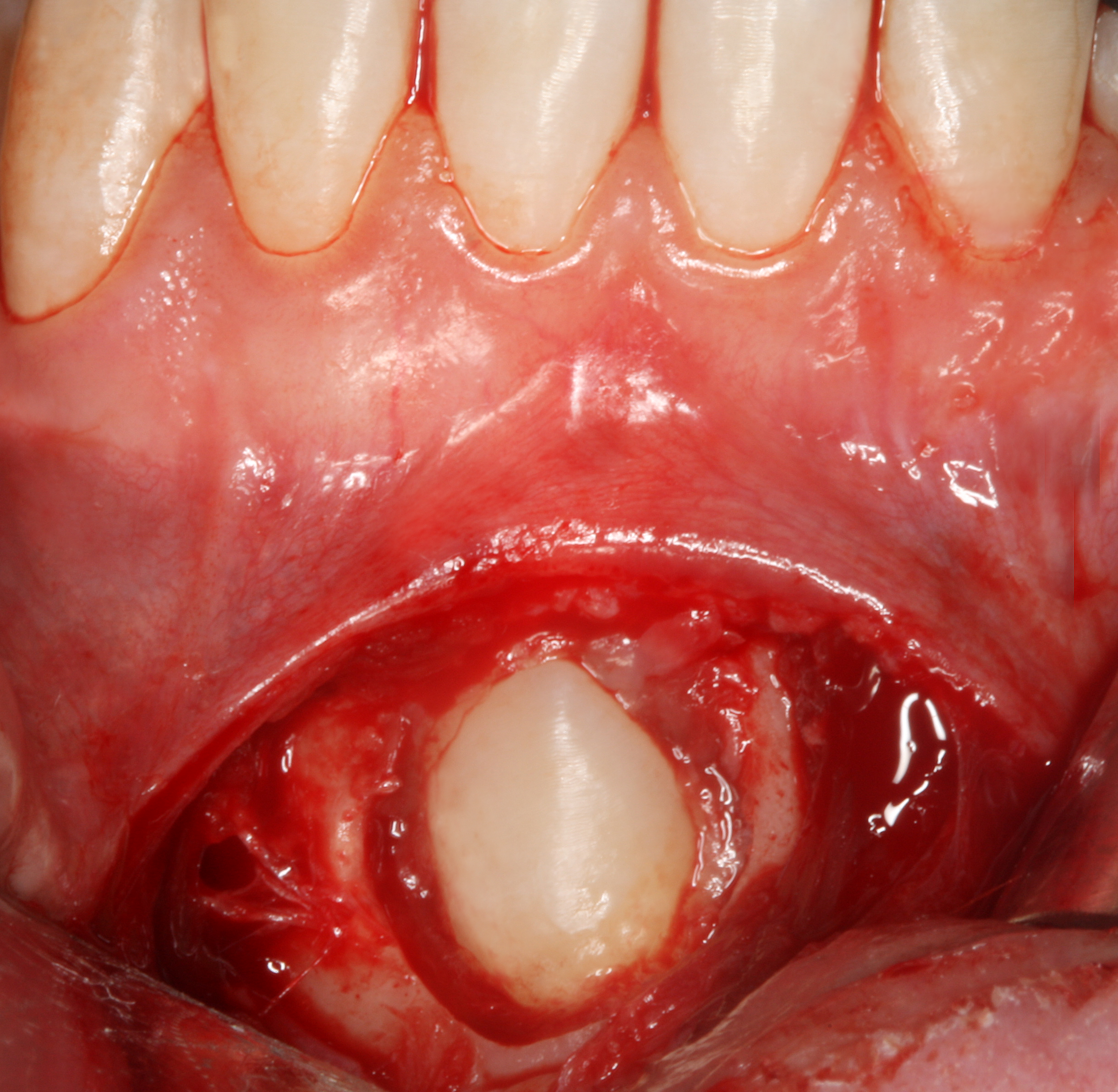
Mandibular canine impacted in the chin

3D CT of mandibular canine impacted in the chin

An impacted tooth is one that fails to erupt into the dental arch within the expected developmental window. Because impacted teeth do not erupt, they are retained throughout the individual's lifetime unless extracted or exposed surgically. Teeth may become impacted because of adjacent teeth, dense overlying bone, excessive soft tissue or a genetic abnormality. Most often, the cause of impaction is inadequate arch length and space in which to erupt; that is, the total length of the alveolar arch is smaller than the tooth arch (the combined mesiodistal width of each tooth). The wisdom teeth (third molars) are frequently impacted because they are the last teeth to erupt in the oral cavity. Mandibular third molars are more commonly impacted than their maxillary counterparts.

Some dentists believe that impacted teeth should be removed. This is often true for third molars causing various problems like pericoronitis, resorption of adjacent second molar, etc. Other impacted teeth, especially canines or incisors, can be aligned with the rest of the dental arch by orthodontic treatment, thus regaining and retaining their mechanical and aesthetic function. In some cases, impacted teeth can be left in place, but periodical check-ups are required for a possible pathological development. Removal of asymptomatic, pathology-free, impacted teeth is not a medical consensus; watchful monitoring may be a more prudent and cost-effective strategy, and make the future placement of a dental implant through such impacted tooth a feasible approach.

== Classification ==
Classifications enable the oral surgeon to determine the difficulty in removal of the impacted tooth. The primary factor determining the difficulty is accessibility, which is determined by adjacent teeth or other structures that impair access or delivery pathway. The majority of classification schemes are based on analysis on a radiograph. The most frequently considered factors are discussed below.

=== Angulation of tooth ===
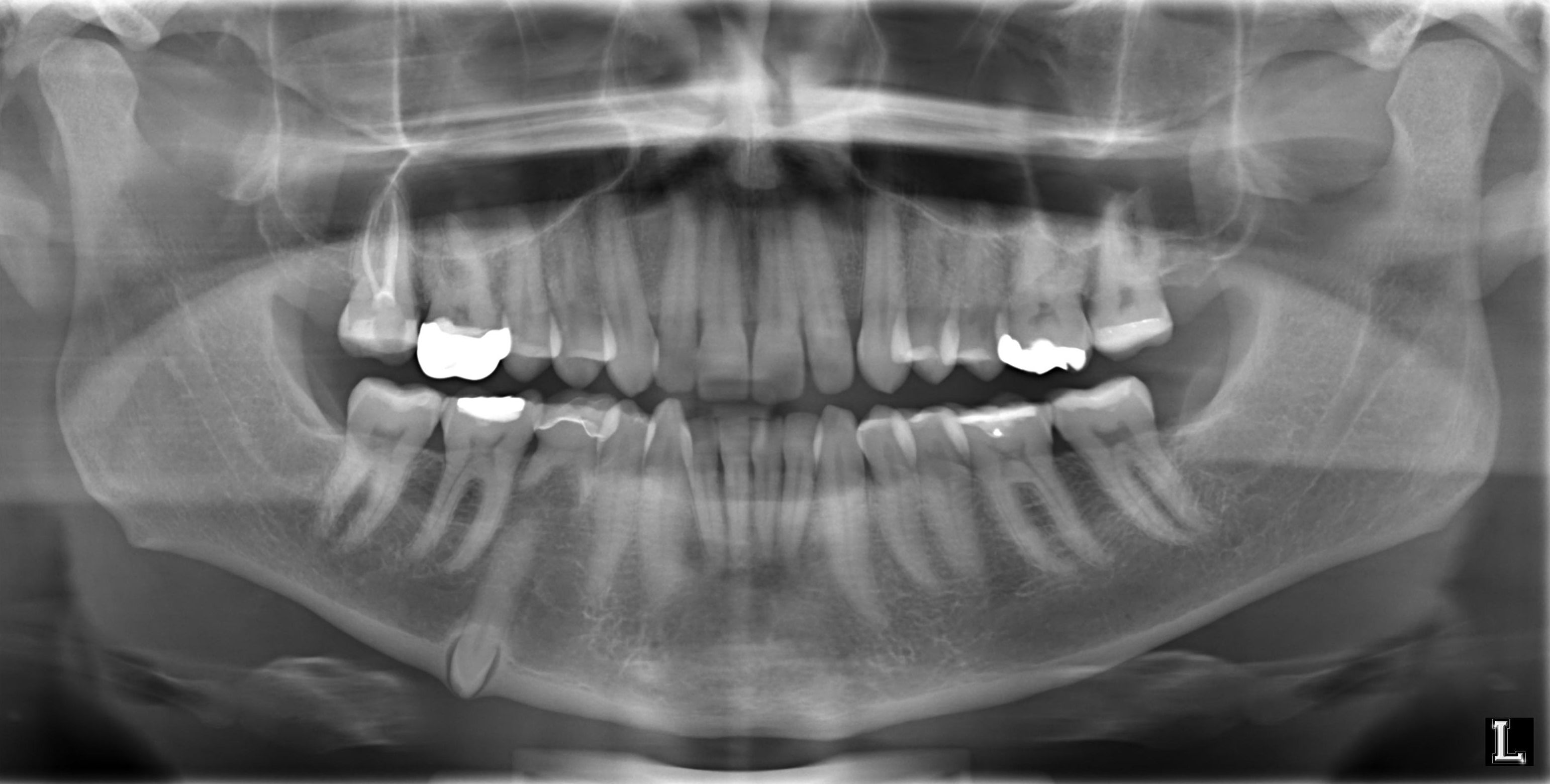
Very rare case of vertical premolar impaction: the permanent second premolar on the lower right side of the mouth is impacted, inverted and pierces the mandibular bone. Notice that the deciduous second molar is also present, which is uncommon because the patient is a 37-year-old man.

Most commonly used classification system with respect to treatment planning. Depending on the angulation the tooth might be classified as:

- Mesioangular
- Horizontal
- Vertical
- Distoangular
- Palatal
- Buccal
- Lingual

=== Relationship of tooth to anterior border of ramus ===
This type of classification is based on the amount of impacted tooth that is covered with the mandibular ramus. It is known as the Pell and Gregory classification, classes 1, 2, and 3.

=== Relationship of tooth to occlusal plane ===
The depth of the impacted tooth in relation to the adjacent second molar serves as the foundation for this type of classification. This was also given by Pell and Gregory and is known as the Pell and Gregory A, B, and C classification. Relationship to the occlusal plane A-C classes

== Complications ==
Erupted teeth that are adjacent to impacted teeth are predisposed to periodontal disease. Since the most difficult tooth surface to be cleaned is the distal surface of the last tooth, in the presence of an impacted tooth there is always gingival inflammation around the second molar that is invariably present. Even this minor amount of inflammation can provide bacteria access to a larger portion of the root surface that results in early formation of periodontitis compromising the tooth. Even in situations in which no obvious communication exists between the mouth and the impacted third molar there may be enough communication to initiate dental caries (tooth decay).

=== Pericoronitis ===
Pericoronitis is an infection of the soft tissue that covers the crown of an impacted tooth and is usually caused by the normal oral microbiota. For most people there exists a balance between the host defenses and the oral micriobiota but if the host defenses are compromised like during minor illness such as influenza or an upper respiratory tract infection, pericoronitis results. Another common cause is entrapment of food beneath the gum flap (also called an operculum). Pericoronitis can present as a mild infection or severe infection. In its mildest form it is just a localized tissue swelling and soreness whereas in severe forms the swelling is slightly larger even sometimes creating trismus (difficulty opening the mouth).

Occasionally, an impacted tooth causes sufficient pressure on the roots of adjacent teeth causing it to resorb.

An impacted tooth occupies space that is usually filled with bone. This weakens that area of bone and renders the jaw more susceptible to fracture.

When impacted teeth are retained completely within the alveolar process, the associated follicular sac is also retained along with it. Though in most persons the dental follicle maintains its original size sometimes it may undergo cystic degeneration and become a dentigerous cyst or a keratocyst.

== Symptoms ==
Most commonly, the individual complains of food becoming lodged beneath the gums and soreness, which is frequently misdiagnosed as a throat infection. Swelling is visible in milder forms, and opening the mouth becomes difficult in severe cases. Pain is always present.

== Management ==
Depending on the dentist (and the health authority's guidelines in that country), and the situation, impacted teeth may be extracted or left alone. Extraction may be contraindicated, simple, or surgical, depending on the location of the teeth.

Sometimes, a surgeon may wish to expose the canine for aesthetic purposes. This may be achieved through open or closed exposure. Studies show no advantage of one method over another. A laser can be used to uncover superficially impacted teeth with no bleeding and quick recovery.

== See also ==
- Impacted wisdom teeth
