= Cemento-osseous dysplasia =

Abnormal production of bone in the mandible

- Other names: Florid osseous dysplasia
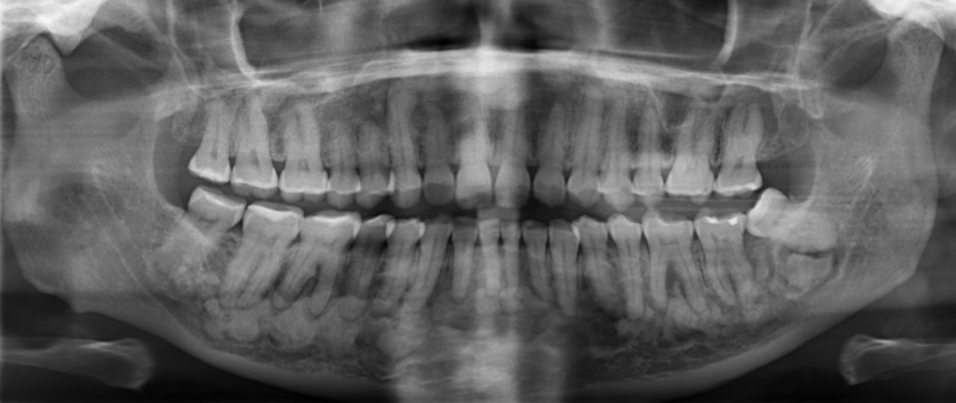
- Florid osseous dysplasia of the mandible
- Specialty: Dentistry
- Symptoms: May or may not be symptomatic, radiographic finding
- Complications: Infection with extractions or abscessed teeth, unnecessary root canals
- Usual onset: 20-30 years
- Types: Localized, generalized
- Causes: Congenital
- Diagnostic method: X-ray, CBCT scan, vitality testing of teeth
- Differential diagnosis: Paget's disease of bone, fibrous dysplasia, Tooth abscess
- Treatment: None required

Cemento-osseous dysplasia (COD) is a benign condition of the jaws that may arise from the fibroblasts of the periodontal ligaments. It is most common in middle-aged females of African descent. The three types are periapical cemental dysplasia (common in those of African descent), focal cemento-osseous dysplasia (Caucasians), and florid cemento-osseous dysplasia (African descent). Periapical COD occurs most commonly in the mandibular anterior teeth while focal COD appears predominantly in the mandibular posterior teeth. Florid COD is an extensive variant of periapical COD where lesions occur in multiple quadrants which can encompass the maxilla and mandible, and infrequently can cause jawbone deformity.

== Disease process ==
COD occurs when fibrous tissue containing osteoid and cementoid replace bone, and may be due to pathogenic mutations in various signaling pathways. It is a self-limiting and dysplastic process.

== Risk factors ==
Risk factors for experiencing symptoms associated with COD include the size of the lesion, apical involvement, and infection within the lesion. Patients with larger lesions tend to experience symptoms, likely due to the growth impinging on adjacent structures. Lesions in proximity to the apex of a tooth, especially those associated with caries or periodontal disease, may have a greater chance of becoming infected. Lastly, local infection within a COD lesion, often leading to necrosis of the area, is another risk factor for symptomatic COD.

== Symptoms ==
Most patients are asymptomatic and the condition is only found during radiographic analyses. In a study, 14.7% of patients were symptomatic, with pain being the most common symptom and may be associated with osteomyelitis. Other symptoms may include hypoesthesia, paresthesia, and discomfort. In rare instances, patients may experience associated facial swelling with the presence or absence of pain due to concurrent infection. Patients experiencing symptoms also tend to be older and have the periapical form of cemento-osseous dysplasia. Studies have demonstrated that these patients tend to be in the fourth decade of life, and approximately 70% of COD cases are located near teeth apices.

== Diagnosis ==
Diagnosis is based on clinical and radiographic observations, and in rare cases, biopsy may be performed. Diagnosis is important so that the treating doctor does not confuse it for another periapical disease such as rarefying osteitis or condensing osteitis. Incorrect diagnosis could lead to unnecessary root canal treatments, or biopsy or surgical intervention which can be invasive and increase the risk of infection. A pulp vitality test such as a cold test or electric pulp test can aid in diagnosis, since COD generally does not compromise pulp vitality. COD can be found in individuals of all ages and ethnic backgrounds, but it has been observed more frequently in individuals of African, East Asian, and Asian descent. Cone-beam computed tomography (CBCT) has proven useful in distinguishing between COD and periapical cysts, when examined with quantitative texture analysis using specialized software.

== Treatment ==
Asymptomatic patients do not typically require treatment. For these patients, dental prophylaxis and regular monitoring are the primary recommended treatment steps which will help prevent future risk of infection. Symptomatic patients may receive treatment options that include surgical curettage with bleeding stimulation or pulp vitality testing in areas showing periapical inflammation.

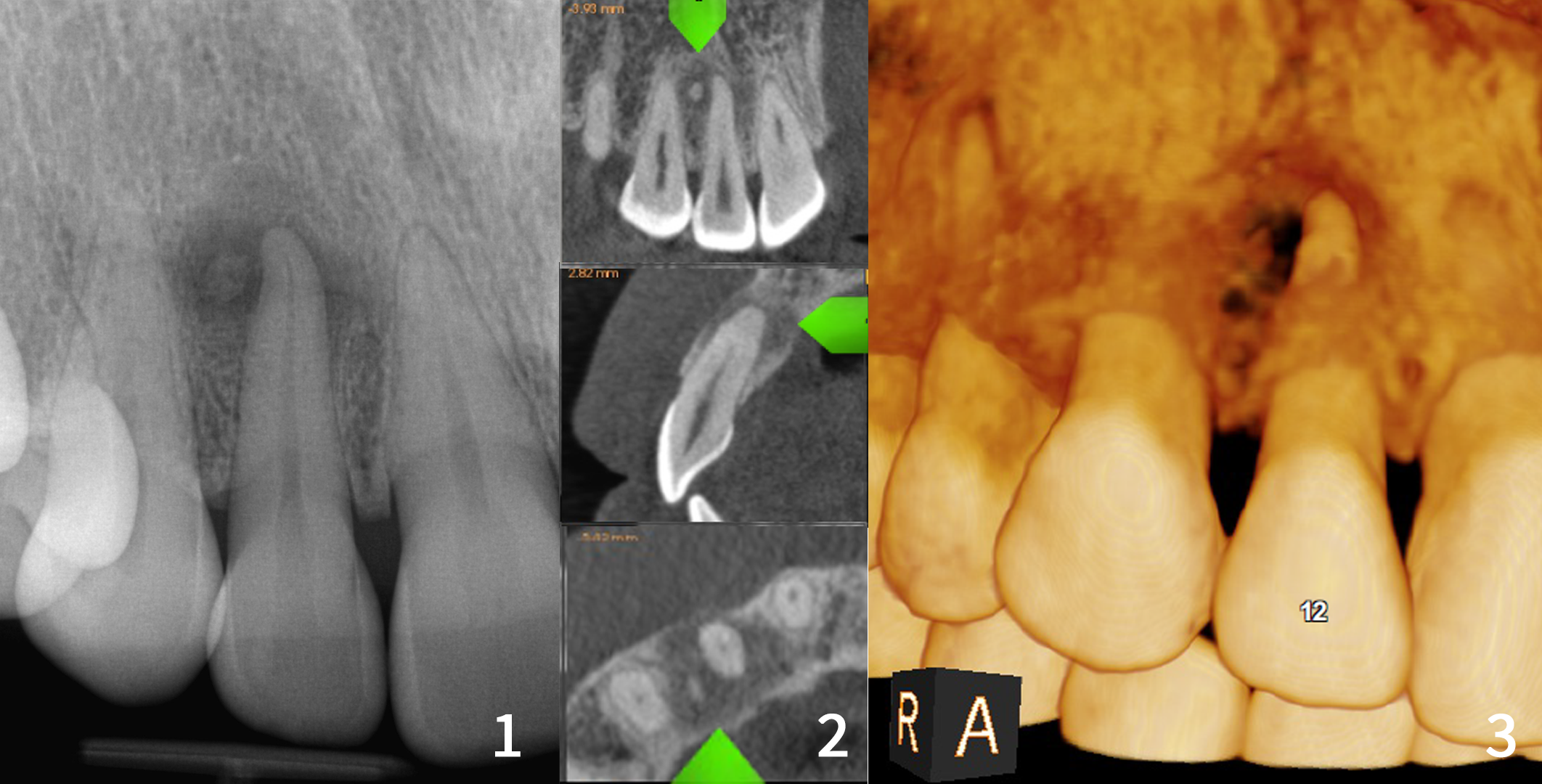
xray and CBCT scans of periapical cemental dysplasia
