= Rarefying osteitis =

Medical condition

Rarefying osteitis is a general term for a radiolucent lesion on a radiograph usually diagnosed as a periapical abscess or a periapical cyst.
