= Alveolar osteitis =

Inflammation of tooth sockets in the jawbones

- Other names: Dry socket, fibrinolytic alveolitis
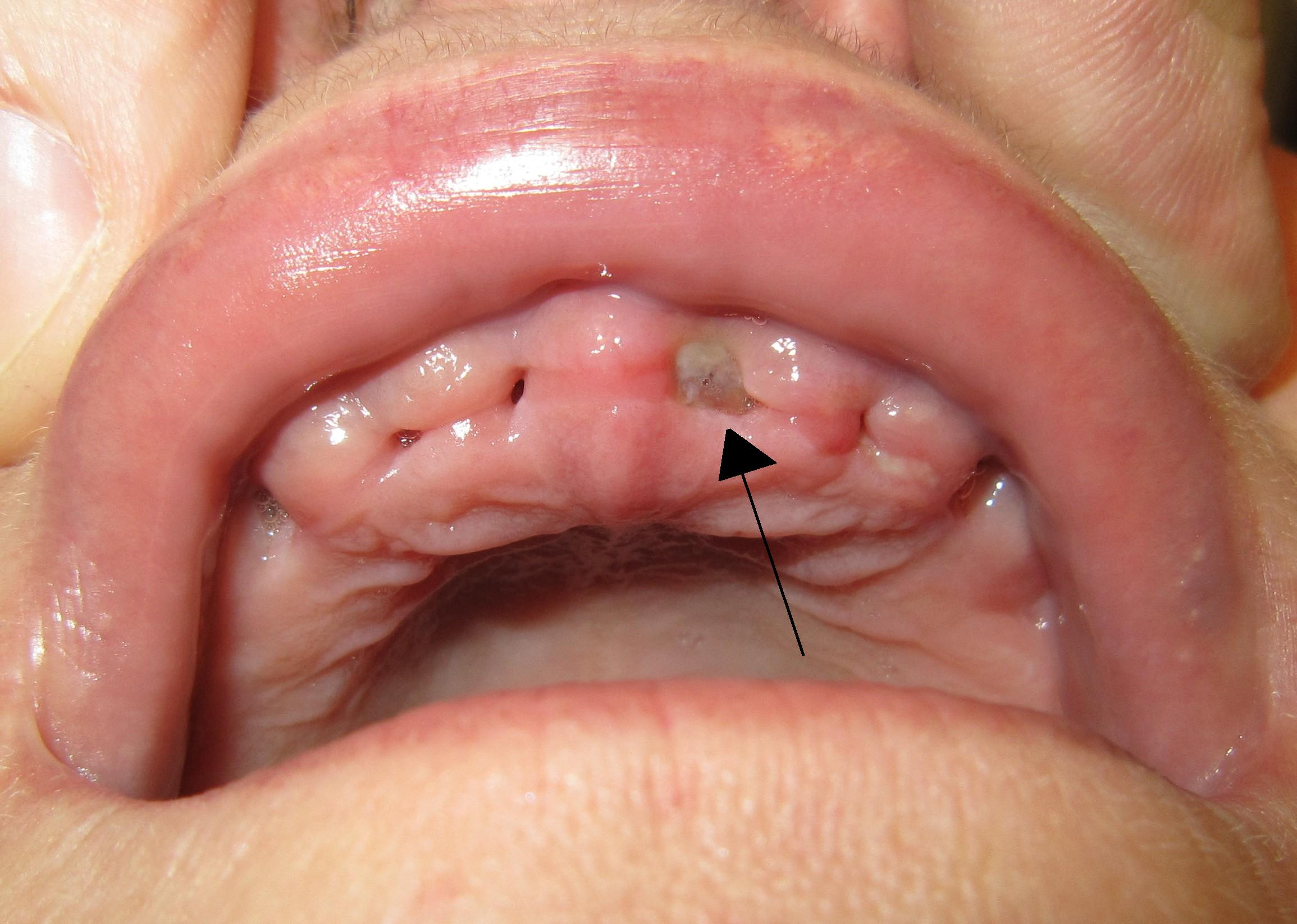
- Alveolar osteitis of a socket after extraction of all maxillary teeth; note lack of blood clot in socket and exposed alveolar bone
- Specialty: Dentistry

Alveolar osteitis, also known as dry socket, is inflammation of the alveolar bone (i.e., the alveolar process of the maxilla or mandible). Classically, this occurs as a postoperative complication of tooth extraction.

Alveolar osteitis usually occurs where the blood clot fails to form or is lost from the socket (i.e., the defect left in the gum when a tooth is taken out). This leaves an empty socket where bone is exposed to the oral cavity, causing a localized alveolar osteitis limited to the lamina dura (i.e., the bone which lines the socket). This specific type is known as dry socket and is associated with increased pain and delayed healing.

Dry socket occurs in 0.5% to 5% of routine dental extractions, and in about 25–30% of extractions of mandibular (lower) wisdom teeth that are impacted (buried in the bone of the lower jaw, erupting during adulthood).

== Signs and symptoms ==
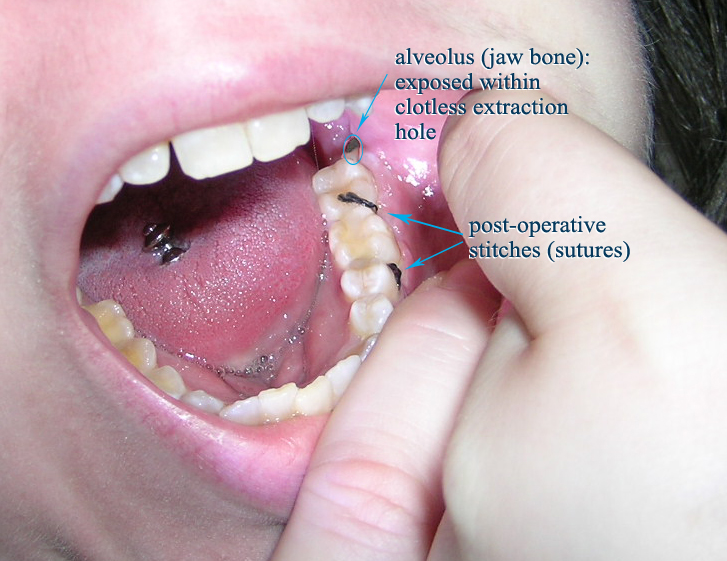
The most common location of dry socket: in the socket of an extracted mandibular third molar (wisdom tooth).

Since alveolar osteitis is not primarily an infection, there is not usually any pyrexia (fever) or cervical lymphadenitis (swollen glands in the neck), and only minimal edema (swelling) and erythema (redness) is present in the soft tissues surrounding the socket.

Signs may include:

- An empty socket, which is partially or totally devoid of blood clot. Exposed bone may be visible or the socket may be filled with food debris which reveals the exposed bone once it is removed. The exposed bone is extremely painful and sensitive to touch. Surrounding inflamed soft tissues may overlie the socket and hide the dry socket from casual examination.
- Denuded (bare) bone walls.

Symptoms may include:

- Dull, aching, throbbing pain in the area of the socket, which is moderate to severe and may radiate to other parts of the head such as the ear, eye, temple and neck. The pain normally starts on the second to fourth day after the extraction, and may last 10–40 days. The pain may be so strong that even strong analgesics do not relieve it.
- Intraoral halitosis (oral malodor).
- Bad taste in the mouth.

== Causes ==
The cause(s) of dry socket are not completely understood. Normally, following extraction of a tooth, blood is extravasated into the socket, and a blood clot (thrombus) forms. This blood clot is replaced with granulation tissue which consists of proliferating fibroblasts and endothelial cells derived from remnants of the periodontal membrane, surrounding alveolar bone and gingival mucosa. In time this in turn is replaced by coarse, fibrillar bone and finally by mature, woven bone. The clot may fail to form because of poor blood supply (e.g., secondary to local factors such as smoking, anatomical site, bone density and conditions which cause sclerotic bone to form). The clot may be lost because of excessive mouth rinsing, or disintegrate prematurely due to fibrinolysis. Fibrinolysis is the degeneration of the clot and may be caused by the conversion of plasminogen to plasmin and formation of kinins. Factors which promote fibrinolysis include local trauma, estrogens, and pyrogens from bacteria.

Bacteria may secondarily colonize the socket, and lead to further dissolution of the clot. Bacterial breakdown and fibrinolysis are widely accepted as major contributing factors to the loss of the clot. Bone tissue is exposed to the oral environment, and a localized inflammatory reaction takes place in the adjacent marrow spaces. This localizes the inflammation to the walls of the socket, which become necrotic. The necrotic bone in the socket walls is slowly separated by osteoclasts and fragmentary sequestra may form. The bones of the jaws seem to have some evolutionary resistance to this process. When bone is exposed at other sites in the human body, this is a much more serious condition.

In a dry socket, healing is delayed because tissue must grow from the surrounding gingival mucosa, which takes longer than the normal organisation of a blood clot. Some patients may develop short term halitosis, which is the result of food debris stagnating in the socket and the subsequent action of halitogenic bacteria. The main factors involved in the development of dry socket are discussed below.

=== Extraction site ===
Dry sockets more commonly occur in the mandible (lower jaw) than the maxilla (upper), due to the relatively poor blood supply of the mandible and also because food debris tends to gather in lower sockets more readily than upper ones. It more commonly occurs in posterior sockets (molar teeth) than anterior sockets (premolars and incisors), possibly because the size of the created surgical defect is relatively larger, and because the blood supply is relatively poorer at these sites. Dry socket is especially associated with extraction of lower wisdom teeth. Inadequate irrigation (washing) of the socket has been associated with increased likelihood of dry socket.

=== Infection ===
Dry socket is more likely to occur where there is a pre-existing infection in the mouth, such as necrotizing ulcerative gingivitis or chronic periodontitis. Wisdom teeth not associated with pericoronitis are less likely to cause a dry socket when extracted. The oral microbiota has been demonstrated to have fibrinolytic action in some individuals, and these persons may be predisposed to developing dry sockets after tooth extraction. Infection of the socket following tooth extraction is different from dry socket, although in dry socket secondary infection may occur in addition.

=== Smoking ===
Smoking and tobacco use of any kind are associated with increased risk of dry socket. This may be partially due to the vasoconstrictive action of nicotine on small blood vessels. Another risk can be attributed to the actual inhalation, as drawing smoke, particularly from dense filters or tightly rolled cigarettes, creates a small amount of suction that can cause the blood clot in a healing gum to become loose or dislodged over a period of time. Not smoking in the days immediately following a dental extraction reduces the risk of a dry socket occurring.

=== Surgical trauma ===
Dry socket is more likely to occur following a difficult tooth extraction. It is thought that excessive force applied to the tooth, or excessive movement of the tooth burnishes the bony walls of the socket and crushes blood vessels, impairing the repair process.

=== Vasoconstrictors ===
Vasoconstrictors are present in most local anesthetics and are intended to increase the length of analgesia by reducing blood supply to the region which reduces the amount of local anesthetic solution that is absorbed into the circulation and carried from the local tissues. Hence, use of local anesthetics with vasoconstrictors is associated with an increased risk of dry socket occurring. However, on occasion, use of local anesthetic without vasoconstrictors would not provide sufficient analgesia, especially in the presence of acute pain and infection on maxillary teeth, meaning that the total dose of local anesthetic may need to be increased. Adequate pain control during the extraction is balanced against an increased risk of dry socket. However, the use of 3% mepivacaine without epinephrine in inferior alveolar nerve blocks has been found to have a similar anesthetic effect to that of lidocaine with 1:100,000 epinephrine, save for a shorter duration of action, and, as such, this may be considered as an alternative in simple mandibular extractions.

=== Radiotherapy ===
Radiotherapy directed at the bones of the jaws causes several changes to the tissue, resulting in decreased blood supply.

=== Menstrual cycle ===
The menstrual cycle could be a determinant risk factor in the frequency of alveolar osteitis. Studies have shown that because of hormonal changes, women in the middle of menstrual cycle and the ones taking oral contraceptives (birth control pills) have a higher tendency of having alveolar osteitis after their tooth extraction surgery. It is recommended that elective surgeries be performed during the menstrual period in both users and non-users of oral contraceptives, to eliminate the effect of cycle-related hormonal changes on the development of alveolar osteitis.

== Diagnosis ==
Dry socket typically causes pain on the second to fourth day following a dental extraction. Other causes of post extraction pain usually occur immediately after the anesthesia/analgesia has worn off, (e.g., normal pain from surgical trauma or mandibular fracture) or has a more delayed onset (e.g., osteomyelitis, which typically causes pain several weeks following an extraction). Examination typically involves gentle irrigation with warm saline and probing of the socket to establish the diagnosis. Sometimes part of the root of the tooth or a piece of bone fractures off and is retained in the socket. This can be another cause of pain in a socket and causes delayed healing. A dental radiograph (X-ray) may be indicated to demonstrate such a suspected fragment.

== Prevention ==
Some evidence suggests that rinsing with chlorhexidine (0.12% or 0.2%) or placing chlorhexidine gel (0.2%) in the sockets of extracted teeth reduces the frequency of dry socket. Another review concluded that preventative antibiotics reduce the risk of dry socket (and infection and pain) following third molar extractions in healthy individuals. The authors questioned whether treating 19 people with antibiotics to prevent one infection would do more harm overall than good, in view of the potential side effects and also of antibiotic resistance. Nevertheless, there is evidence that some individuals, based on a clinical assessment of their conditions, who are at clear risk may benefit from antibiotics. There is also evidence that antifibrinolytic agents applied to the socket after the extraction may reduce the risk of dry socket.

Some dentists and oral surgeons routinely debride the bony walls of the socket to encourage hemorrhage (bleeding) in the belief that this reduces the incidence of dry socket, but there is no evidence to support this practice. It has been suggested that dental extractions in females taking oral contraceptives be scheduled on days without estrogen supplementation (typically days 23–28 of the menstrual cycle). It has also been suggested that teeth to be extracted be scaled prior to the procedure.

Prevention of alveolar osteitis can be exacted by following post-operative instructions, including:

1. Taking any recommended medications
2. Avoiding intake of hot fluids for one to two days. Hot fluids raise the local blood flow and thus interfere with organization of the clot. Therefore, cold fluids and foods are encouraged, which facilitate clot formation and prevent its disintegration.
3. Avoiding smoking. It reduces the blood supply, leading to tissue ischemia, reduced tissue perfusion and eventually higher incidence of painful socket.
4. Avoiding drinking through a straw or spitting forcefully as this creates a negative pressure within the oral cavity leading to an increased chance of blood clot instability.

== Treatment ==
Treatment is usually symptomatic, (i.e., pain medications) and also the removal of debris from the socket by irrigation with saline or local anesthetic. Medicated dressings are also commonly placed in the socket; although these will act as a foreign body and prolong healing, they are usually needed due to the pain. The dressings are usually stopped once the pain is lessened. Examples of medicated dressings include antibacterials, topical anesthetics and obtundants, or combinations of all three, e.g., zinc oxide and eugenol impregnated cotton pellets, alvogyl (eugenol, iodoform and butamben), dentalone, bismuth subnitrate and iodoform paste (BIPP) on ribbon gauze and metronidazole and lidocaine ointment. A 2012 review of treatments for dry socket concluded that there was not enough evidence to determine the effectiveness of any treatments. People who develop a dry socket typically seek healthcare advice several times after the dental extraction, where the old dressing is removed, the socket irrigated and a new dressing placed. Curettage of the socket increases the pain and whether it is of overall benefit is debated.

== Prognosis ==
If a dry socket occurs, the total healing time is increased. Postoperative pain is also worse than the normal discomfort which accompanies healing following any minor surgical procedure. The pain may last for seven to forty days.

== Epidemiology ==
Overall, the rate of dry socket is about 0.5–5% for routine dental extractions, and about 25–30% for impacted mandibular third molars (wisdom teeth which are buried in the bone).

Females are more frequently affected than males, but this appears to be related to oral contraceptive use rather than any underlying gender predilection. The majority of dry sockets occur in individuals aged between 20 and 40 which is when most dental extractions occur, although for any given individual it is more likely to occur with increasing age.

Other possible risk factors include periodontal disease, acute necrotizing ulcerative gingivitis, local bone disease, Paget's disease of bone, osteopetrosis, cemento-osseous dysplasia, a history of previously developing a dry socket with past extractions and inadequate oral hygiene. Other factors in the postoperative period that may lead to loss of the blood clot include forceful spitting, sucking through a straw, and coughing or sneezing.

== Etymology ==
Alveolar refers to the alveolus, the alveolar processes of the mandible or maxilla; osteitis is derived from oste-, from Greek, osteon meaning "bone"; and -itis means a disease characterized by inflammation.

Osteitis generally refers to localized inflammation of bone with no progression through marrow spaces (compare with osteomyelitis).

Often, the term alveolar osteitis is considered synonymous with "dry socket", but some specify that dry socket is a focal or localized alveolar osteitis. An example of another type of osteitis is focal sclerosing/condensing osteitis. The name dry socket is used because the socket has a dry appearance once the blood clot is lost and debris is washed away.
