= Anatomic space =

In anatomy, a spatium or anatomic space is a space (cavity or gap). Anatomic spaces are often landmarks to find other important structures. When they fill with gases (such as air) or liquids (such as blood) in pathological ways, they can suffer conditions such as pneumothorax, edema, or pericardial effusion. Many anatomic spaces are potential spaces, which means that they are potential rather than realized (with their realization being dynamic according to physiologic or pathophysiologic events). In other words, they are like an empty plastic bag that has not been opened (two walls collapsed against each other; no interior volume until opened) or a balloon that has not been inflated.

Examples of anatomic spaces (or potential spaces) include:

- Axillary space
- Buccal space
- Canine space
- Cystohepatic triangle
- Deep perineal space
- Deep temporal space
- Epidural space
- Extraperitoneal space
- Fascial spaces of the head and neck
- Infratemporal space
- Intercostal space
- Intermembrane space
- Interstitial spaces
- Mental space
- Pericardial space
- Intraperitoneal space
- Pleural space
- Potential space
- Pterygomandibular space
- Quadrangular space
- Retroperitoneal space
- Retropharyngeal space
- Retropubic space
- Subarachnoid space
- Subdural space
- Sublingual space
- Submandibular space
- Submasseteric space
- Traube's space

== See also ==
- Body cavity
