= Mental space (anatomy) =

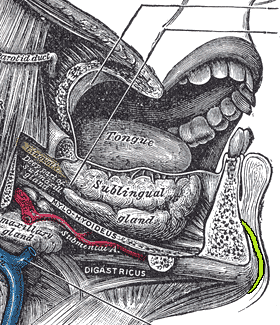
- Plane of dissection that would create the mental space, highlighted in green, between the mentalis and the platysma muscles.

The mental space is a fascial space of the head and neck (also termed fascial spaces or tissue spaces). It is a potential space, bilaterally located in the chin, between the mentalis muscle superiorly and the platysma muscle inferiorly. These spaces may be created by pathology, e.g., the spread of odontogenic infection. Commonly the origin of the infection is an anterior mandibular tooth with associated periapical abscess which erodes through the buccal cortical plate of the mandibular at a level below the attachment of the mentalis muscle. The mental space also has the mental foramen located laterally on both the right and left sides. This is important as many mandibular nerves pass through these foremens.
