= Canine space =

Fascial space of the head and neck

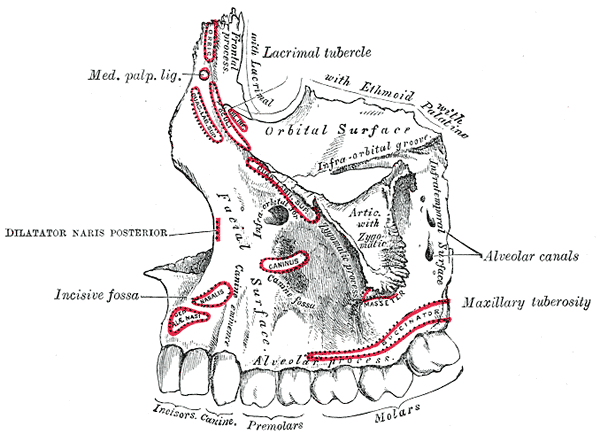
- Lateral view of the maxilla, showing infra-orbital area, including the canine fossa, and muscle attachments

The canine space (also termed the infra-orbital space) is a fascial space of the head and neck (sometimes also termed fascial spaces or tissue spaces). It is a thin potential space on the face, and is paired on either side. It is located between the levator anguli oris muscle inferiorly and the levator labii superioris muscle superiorly. The term is derived from the fact that the space is in the region of the canine fossa, and that infections originating from the maxillary canine tooth may spread to involve the space. Infra-orbital is derived from infra- meaning below and orbit which refers to the eye socket.

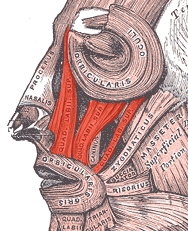
Diagram showing muscles of infra-orbital region. The levator labii superioris muscle is colored red.

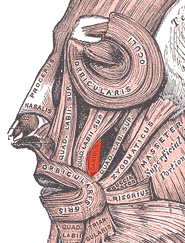
Diagram showing muscles of the infra-orbital region. Levator anguli oris is colored red. The canine space is situated between the levator anguli oris muscle and the levator labii superioris muscle.

== Structure ==
=== Boundaries ===
The boundaries of the canine space are:

- the nasal cartilages anteriorly
- the buccal space posteriorly
- the quadratus labii superioris muscle (levator labii superioris) superiorly
- the oral mucosa of the maxillary labial sulcus inferiorly
- the quadratus labii superioris muscle superficially
- and the deep border is created by the levator anguli oris muscle.

=== Communications ===
The canine space communicates with the buccal space posteriorly.

== Function ==
=== Contents ===
The contents of the canine space are:

- the angular artery and angular vein
- the infra-orbital nerve (a branch of the maxillary division of the trigeminal nerve)

== Clinical significance ==
Canine space infections may occur by spread of infection from the buccal space. Signs and symptoms of a canine space abscess might include swelling that obliterates the nasolabial fold. If left untreated, infections of this space will eventually spontaneously drain via the medial or lateral canthus of the eye, as this is the path of least resistance. Treatment is usually by surgical incision and drainage, and the incision is placed inside the mouth to avoid a facial scar.

Rarely, when infections of the canine space erode into the infra-orbital vein or the inferior ophthalmic vein (via the sinuses), there can be spread via the common ophthalmic vein through the superior orbital fissure and into the cavernous sinus. This can result in septic cavernous sinus thrombosis, which is a rare, but life-threatening condition.

=== Odontogenic infection ===
Odontogenic infections may spread to involve the canine space. The most likely causative tooth is the maxillary canine or maxillary first premolar. This occurs when pus (e.g. from a periapical abscess), perforates the buccal cortical plate of the maxilla above the level of attachment of the levator anguli oris muscle. This is more likely if the tooth root is long (the maxillary canine has the longest root of all the teeth), and its apex lies at a level above the muscle attachment.
