= Deep temporal space =

Anatomical region of the head and neck

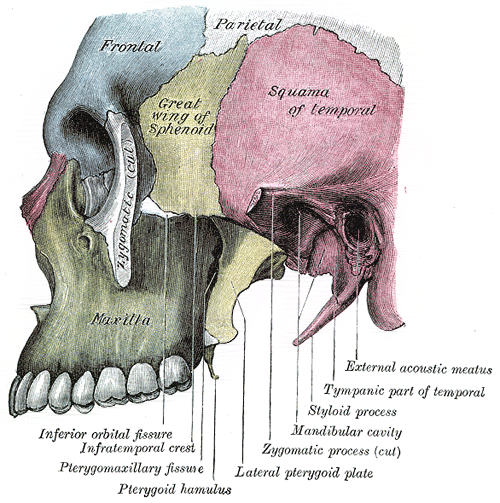
- Lateral view of skull, with part of the zygomatic complex removed.

The deep temporal space is a fascial space of the head and neck (sometimes also termed fascial spaces or tissue spaces). It is a potential space in the side of the head, and is paired on either side. It is located deep to the temporalis muscle

The inferior portion of the deep temporal space is also termed the infratemporal space. The deep temporal space is one of the four compartments of the masticator space, along with the pterygomandibular space, the submasseteric space and the superficial temporal space. The deep temporal space is separated from the pterygomandibular space by the lateral pterygoid muscle inferiorly and from the superficial temporal space by the temporalis muscle laterally. The deep temporal space and the superficial temporal space together make up the temporal spaces.

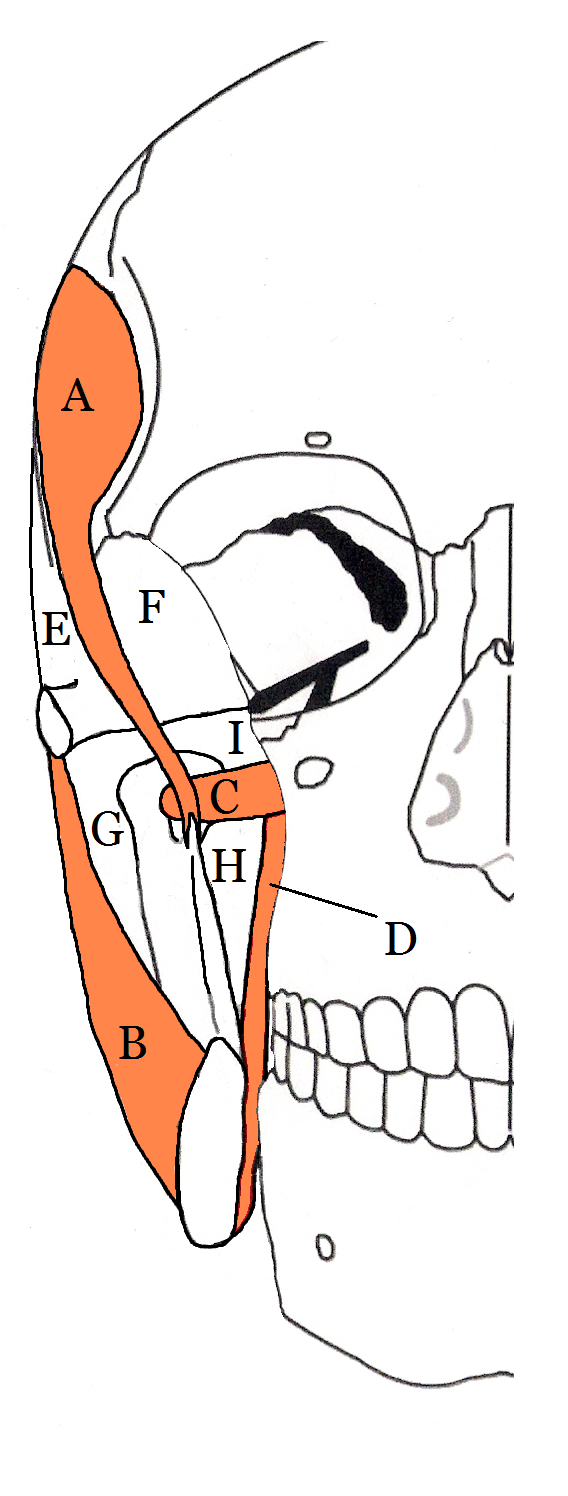
The four compartents of the right masticator space. A Temporalis muscle, B Masseter muscle, C Lateral pterygoid muscle, D Medial ptaerygoid muscle, E Superficial temporal space, F Deep temporal space, G Submasseteric space, H Pterygomandibular space, I Approximate location of infratemporal space.

== Location and structure ==
=== Anatomic boundaries ===
The boundaries of the deep temporal space are:

Superior:

Superior and Inferior temporal lines

Inferior:

Infratemporal crest and Zygomatic arch

=== Communications ===
The communications of the deep temporal space are:

=== Contents ===
The contents of the deep temporal space are:

Temporalis muscle
