= Temporal space =

Temporal space may refer to:

- Deep temporal space
- Infratemporal space
