= Antibiotic use in dentistry =

There are many circumstances during dental treatment where antibiotics are prescribed by dentists to prevent further infection (e.g. post-operative infection). The most common antibiotic prescribed by dental practitioners is penicillin in the form of amoxicillin, however many patients are hypersensitive to this particular antibiotic. Therefore, in the cases of allergies, erythromycin is used instead.

== Indications for antibiotic use ==
Antibiotics should only be used for oral infections where there is evidence of spreading infection (cellulitis, lymph node involvement, swelling) or systemic involvement (fever, malaise), and where drainage or debridement is impossible. There are a limited number of localized oral lesions that are indicated for antibiotic use and these include periodontal abscess, acute necrotizing ulcerative gingivitis, and pericoronitis. A periapical abscess responds well to antibiotics if chewing gum is used during the first two half-lives of each dose (caution: overzealous mastication may result in muscle pain).

Another condition in which antibiotics are indicated is staphylococcal mucositis and it is mostly found in immunocompromised patients and the elderly. Patients will experience oral discomfort, mucosal inflammation and mucosal bleeding. The common treatment for this type of infection is oral lavages and flucloxacillin.

== Post-operative Infections ==
=== Bacteraemia ===
Bacteraemia is a condition in which bacteria are present in the blood and may cause disease, including systemic disease such as infective endocarditis. Some dental treatments may cause bacteraemia, such as tooth extractions, subgingival scaling or even simple aggressive tooth brushing by patients.

=== Infective Endocarditis ===
If the bacteria involved in the bacteraemia reach the cardiac tissue, infective (or bacterial) endocarditis can develop, with fatal outcomes. Infective endocarditis is an infection of the endothelium lining of the heart. Infective endocarditis is known to dentists as a post-operative infection and is very serious and life-threatening, especially to patients at high risk of developing the disease, due to a weakened heart. This may be through having congenital heart defect, rheumatic or acquired valvular heart disease and prosthetic heart valves or vessels. The most common bacteria associated with infective endocarditis are streptococcus sanguinis.

=== Antibiotic Treatment (Prophylaxis) ===
Historically, the use of antibiotic prophylaxis to prevent post-operative infections, resulting from bacteraemia, and infective endocarditis was practiced by dentists, especially in patients at high risk (i.e. with heart problems). However, according to new recommendations from the National Institution for Health and Care Excellence (NICE), antibiotic prophylaxis should not be offered for all patients at risk of infective endocarditis. This is due to the ever-increasing antibiotic resistance and there is no or very little evidence to show whether antibiotic prophylaxis is effective or ineffective against post-operative infections. Moreover, it is yet to be established whether the benefits of administering antibiotics prophylactically outweighs the inherent risks, such as anaphylactic reaction related deaths. Ethically, there is still a need to discuss with patients, the benefits and disadvantages of antibiotic prophylaxis before they make a decision on whether they will go through with it or not.

== Dental Abscesses ==
An abscess is a painful collection of pus usually caused by bacterial infections. Abscesses are usually the secondary stage of infection. The initial stage of infection is the bacterial infection called cellulitis and is caused by facultative anaerobe bacteria such as Streptococci (e.g. streptococcus pyogenes). This occurs when bacteria gain access into the underlying tissues through odontogenic sources. Pus is usually not produced during this infection. Antibiotic treatment (usually penicillin) is used to prevent progression to a second stage of cellulitis – abscess.

=== Lateral Periodontal Abscesses ===
These abscesses are formed from a blockage in a periodontal pocket and have a vital pulp associated with the tooth. Usually treatment involves the drainage and irrigation of the abscess with antiseptic mouthwash (0.2% Chlorhexidine) and antibiotic therapy is rarely required.

==== Acute Dentoalveolar Abscesses ====
These abscesses are the most commonly occurring orofacial bacterial infection. They are often the result of an inflamed or necrotic dental pulp or an infection of pulpless root canals. This pulp death is often due to the invasion of bacteria from advanced caries. The first line of treatment is the removal of the source of inflammation or infection by local operative measures. Generally, the abscess can be eradicated through surgical drainage alone; however this is sometimes inadequate. Therefore, systemic antibiotic treatment may be required, but only if there is evidence of spreading infection. As the bacteria involved are known, antibiotic therapy selection can be specific, based on published susceptibilities. Penicillin in the form of amoxicillin is the most common antibiotic to use. However, 3% of the patient population is allergic to penicillin, so erythromycin is often used in cases of hypersensitivity.

Studies conducted to investigate the effects of antibiotics on patients with acute periapical periodontitis and acute apical abscess showed that patients receiving antibiotics in addition to root canal treatment did not have a reduced level of inflammation as compared to the patients not receiving antibiotics. However the available research on this topic is not of optimal quality therefore the results are not entirely reliable.

== Common antibiotics used in Dentistry ==
Phenoxymethyl Penicillin: Penicillin-based antibiotics are used commonly against a broad range of bacterial infections within the body, primarily due to non-toxic effects and minor side effects. In dentistry, phenoxymethyl penicillin is used as it is acid-resistant and can be administered orally. Its common uses include treatment against acute oral infections such as dental abscesses, pericoronitis, salivary gland infections and post-extraction infection. The main disadvantage however, is that patients can be allergic to penicillin based materials with a severe anaphylactic reaction occurring. Despite this, it is still commonly used due to it being highly cost effective and relatively safe. Alternative antibiotics include Erythromycin, cephalosporin and several others.

Tetracycline: A wide spectrum antibiotic used to treat multiple bacterial infections. If prescribed during permanent tooth eruption in the mouth, grey staining can occur on the erupting teeth, presenting as a grey band at the point of eruption. The severity of the stain can vary depending on the level of intake of tetracycline. In the UK, there are restrictions on when tetracycline can be prescribed as this staining can be quite severe. Due to the side effect of deposition of tetracycline within developing teeth, it should not be prescribed to children up to 8 years of age as well as pregnant or lactating women.

Tetracycline has been used with some success in the treatment of localised juvenile periodontitis and this has proven to be particularly effective with in vitro studies of organisms associated with chronic and juvenile periodontitis.

Ampicillin and amoxicillin: These antibiotics are a part of the penicillin group of antibiotics but are effective against a broader range of organisms. Amoxicillin is a derivative of ampicillin. In Dentistry, Ampicillin is sometimes used when dealing with dentoalveolar infections, when the antibiotic sensitivity patterns of the causative organisms are unknown. Antibiotics are no longer used as prophylactic treatment of infective endocarditis in the UK, however, Amoxicillin was once used for prophylaxis of infective endocarditis in patients who have undergone oral surgery or deep scaling.

While effective, ampicillin is associated with a higher incidence of drug rashes than penicillin and thus, should not be prescribed to patients with Infectious mononucleosis or lymphocytic leukaemia as there is a higher risk of developing a drug rash.

Erythromycin: This is a wide spectrum antibiotic that has a similar range on the antibacterial spectrum to penicillin, making it the ideal first choice if patients are allergic to penicillin. It is also useful for treatment against B-lactamase-producing bacteria although it is not particularly as effective against oral and dental infections, due to such infections usually being caused by obligate anaerobes.

Cephalosporin: This is an example of a wide spectrum antibiotic that is relatively stable to staphylococcal penicillinase although this stability varies with different cephalosporins. Certain cephalosporins in dentistry can be administered orally while others can be given by injections. In the case of an allergy to penicillin, cephalosporins may be a suitable alternative.

Metronidazole: This is an antimicrobial effective against some protozoa and strict anaerobes. In the UK, it has effective use in dentistry as it is the primary drug prescribed for acute ulcerative gingivitis. It is also sometimes used either alongside penicillin or alone against dentoalveolar infections with the advantage of having a low allergenicity. Mild side effects of metronidazole include transient rashes, furred tongue, an unpleasant taste in the mouth alongside several other side effects not restricted to the oral cavity.

Sulphonamides : This a group of drugs which is used in dentistry as they have a major advantage of being able to penetrate cerebrospinal fluid and this is particularly relevant when prescribing antibiotics, prophylactically against bacterial meningitis in patients who have had severe maxillofacial injuries, where the risk of infection is high. There are various other uses for sulphonamides as treatment with other parts of the body.

Cotrimoxazole: This is an antibiotic which incorporates sulphonamides and trimethoprim. It covers a broad spectrum of activity and in dentistry, is often used where there are clear signs and indications of bacterial infection that is sensitive to cotrimoxazole. This is determined by bacteriological sensitivity tests.

== Precautions with antibiotic use ==
=== Hypersensitivity ===
Hypersensitive reactions are a major problem associated with the use of penicillin. A true allergy to penicillin is rare with an estimated frequency of anaphylaxis at 1-5 per 10 000 cases of penicillin therapy. Many adverse reactions will result in anaphylaxis, nausea, wheezing and laryngeal oedema.

=== Kidney Impairment ===
Some antibiotics are actively eliminated through the kidneys. Impaired renal function will require reduction of the drug dose to avoid excessively elevated plasma drug concentrations that could lead to toxicity. Dose adjustment can be done by reducing the amount administered in each dose or by increasing the interval between doses.

=== Liver Impairment ===
Many antibiotics are metabolized in the liver. In patients with liver failure, the use of such antibiotics should be restricted in order to avoid toxicity and subsequent overdose. Erythromycin, clindamycin and metronidazole are antibiotics that would require dose adjustments when administered to patients with liver failure. Tetracyclines should also be avoided as they are potentially hepatotoxic.
