= Periodontal abscess =

Collection of pus within tissues surrounding a tooth

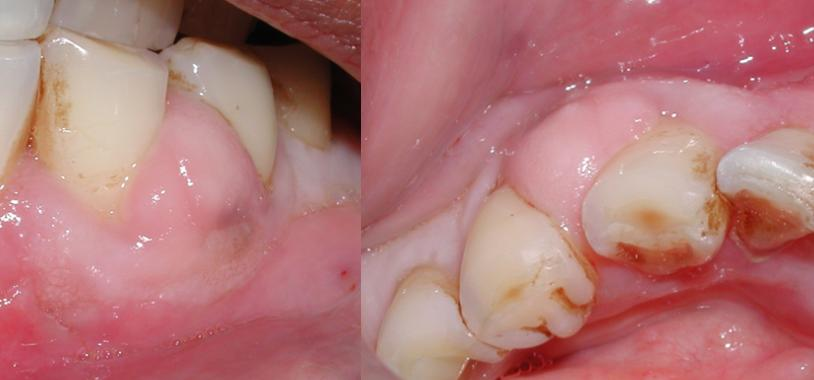
- A gingival abscess between the lower left canine and first premolar.
- Specialty: Dentistry

A periodontal abscess (also termed lateral abscess, or parietal abscess) is a localized collection of pus (i.e. an abscess) within the tissues of the periodontium. It is a type of dental abscess. A periodontal abscess occurs alongside a tooth, and is different from the more common periapical abscess, which represents the spread of infection from a dead tooth (i.e. which has undergone pulpal necrosis). To reflect this, sometimes the term "lateral (periodontal) abscess" is used. In contrast to a periapical abscess, periodontal abscesses are usually associated with a vital (living) tooth. Abscesses of the periodontium are acute bacterial infections classified primarily by location.

== Signs and symptoms ==
The main symptom is pain, which often suddenly appears, and is made worse by biting on the involved tooth, which may feel raised and prominent in the bite. The tooth may be mobile, and the lesion may contribute to destruction of the periodontal ligament and alveolar bone. The pain is deep and throbbing. The oral mucosa covering an early periodontal abscess appears erythematous (red), swollen and painful to touch. The surface may be shiny due to stretching of the mucosa over the abscess. Before pus has formed, the lesion will not be fluctuant, and there will be no purulent discharge. There may be regional lymphadenitis.

When pus forms, the pressure increases, with increasing pain, until it spontaneously drains and relieves the pain. When pus drains into the mouth, a bad taste and smell are perceived. Usually drainage occurs via the periodontal pocket, or else the infection may spread as a cellulitis or a purulent odontogenic infection. Local anatomic factors determine the direction of spread (see fascial spaces of the head and neck). There may be systemic upset, with an onset of pain and fever.

== Causes ==
A periodontal abscess most commonly occurs as a complication of advanced periodontal disease. A periodontal pocket contains dental plaque, bacteria and subgingival calculus. Periodontal pathogens continually find their way into the soft tissues, but normally they are held in check by the immune system. A periodontal abscess represents a change in this balance, related to decreased local or systemic resistance of the host. An inflammatory response occurs when bacteria invade and multiply within the soft tissue of the gingival crevice/periodontal pocket. A pus-filled abscess forms when the immune system responds and attempts to isolate the infection from spreading.

Communication with the oral environment is maintained via the opening of the periodontal pocket. However, if the opening of a periodontal pocket becomes obstructed, as may occur if the pocket has become very deep (e.g. with furcation involvement), then plaque and calculus are trapped inside. Food impaction may also obstruct a periodontal pocket. Food impaction is usually caused by failure to accurately reproduce the contact points when dental restorations are placed on the interproximal surfaces of teeth. Another potential cause occurs when a periodontal pocket is scaled incompletely. Following this procedure, the gingival cuff tightens around the tooth, which may be enough to trap the bacteria left in the pocket. A gingival retraction cord which is accidentally left in situ is an occasional cause of a periodontal abscess.

Penetrating injury to the gingiva—for example, with a toothbrush bristle, fishbone, toothpick or periodontal instrument—may inoculate bacteria into the tissues. Trauma to the tissues, such as serious impact on a tooth or excessive pressure exerted on teeth during orthodontic treatment, can be a possible cause as well. Occlusal overload may also be involved in the development of a periodontal abscess, but this is rare and usually occurs in combination with other factors. Bruxism is a common cause of excessive occlusal forces.

Systemic immune factors such as diabetes can predispose a person to the formation of periodontal abscesses.

Perforation of a root canal during endodontic therapy can also lead to a periodontal abscess which if left untreated could become "prolonged" ultimately rupture then enter the blood stream and could lead to serious situations such as endocarditis.

== Diagnosis ==
Periodontal abscesses may be difficult to distinguish from periapical abscesses. Since the management of a periodontal abscess is different from a periapical abscess, this differentiation is important to make (see Dental abscess) For example, root canal therapy is unnecessary and has no impact on pain in a periodontal abscess.

=== Classification ===
There are four types of abscesses that can involve the periodontal tissues:

1. Gingival abscess—a localized, purulent infection involves only the soft gum tissue near the marginal gingiva or the interdental papilla.
2. Periodontal abscess—a localized, purulent infection involving a greater dimension of the gum tissue, extending apically and adjacent to a periodontal pocket.
3. Pericoronal abscess—a localized, purulent infection within the gum tissue surrounding the crown of a partially or fully erupted tooth. Usually associated with an acute episode of pericoronitis around a partially erupted and impacted mandibular third molar (lower wisdom tooth).
4. combined periodontal/endodontic abscess

== Treatment ==
An important factor is whether the involved tooth is to be extracted or retained. Although the pulp is usually still vital, a history of recurrent periodontal abscesses and significantly compromised periodontal support indicate that the prognosis for the tooth is poor and it should be removed.

The initial management of a periodontal abscess involves pain relief and control of the infection. The pus needs to be drained, which helps both of these aims. If the tooth is to be removed, drainage will occur via the socket. Otherwise, if pus is already discharging from the periodontal pocket, this can be encouraged by gentle irrigation and scaling of the pocket whilst massaging the soft tissues. If this does not work, incision and drainage is required, as described in Dental abscess Treatment.

Antibiotics are of secondary importance to drainage, which if satisfactory renders antibiotics unnecessary. Antibiotics are generally reserved for severe infections, in which there is facial swelling, systemic upset and elevated temperature. Since periodontal abscesses frequently involve anaerobic bacteria, oral antibiotics such as amoxicillin, clindamycin (in penicillin allergy or pregnancy) and/or metronidazole are given (although metronidazole should be used in conjunction with a penicillin given its lack of aerobic gram positive coverage). Ideally, the choice of antibiotic is dictated by the results of microbiological culture and sensitivity testing of a sample of the pus aspirated at the start of any treatment, but this rarely occurs outside the hospital setting.

Other measures that are taken during management of the acute phase might include reducing the height of the tooth with a dental drill, so it no longer contacts the opposing tooth when biting down; and regular use of hot salt water mouth washes (antiseptic) that encourages further drainage of the infection.

The management following the acute phase involves removing any residual infection, and correcting the factors that lead to the formation of the periodontal abscess. Usually, this will be therapy for periodontal disease, such as oral hygiene instruction and periodontal scaling.
