= Radix entomolaris =

The radix entomolaris is an additional root in human's mandibular molar teeth. The human mandibular teeth have two roots usually. In rare cases, however, a root may develop between the distal and the mesial roots which is called entomolaris, if it is located lingual to the tooth. Such a phenomenon is named radix paramolaris in case an extra root is buccal to a molar tooth. An extra root can appear both in the first and second molars.
