= Prophylaxis (disambiguation) =

Prophylaxis in medicine means measures taken to prevent, rather than treat, diseases.

Prophylaxis or prophylactic may also refer to:

- Dental prophylaxis
- Dental antibiotic prophylaxis
- A prophylactic or condom
- Prophylaxis (chess)
- Prophylactic rule, in constitutional law
