= Cutaneous sinus of dental origin =

- Specialty: Dermatology

A cutaneous sinus of dental origin is where a dental infection drains onto the surface of the skin of the face or neck. This is uncommon as usually dental infections drain into the mouth, typically forming a parulis ("gumboil").

Cutaneous sinuses of dental origin tend to occur under the chin or mandible. Without elimination of the source of the infection, the lesion tends to have a relapsing and remitting course, with healing periods and periods of purulent discharge.

Cutaneous sinus tracts may result in fibrosis and scarring which may cause cosmetic concern. Sometimes minor surgery is carried out to remove the residual lesion.
