= Submasseteric space =

Fascial space of the head and neck

- Location of the masseter muscles. The submasseteric space is between the masseter and the mandible.

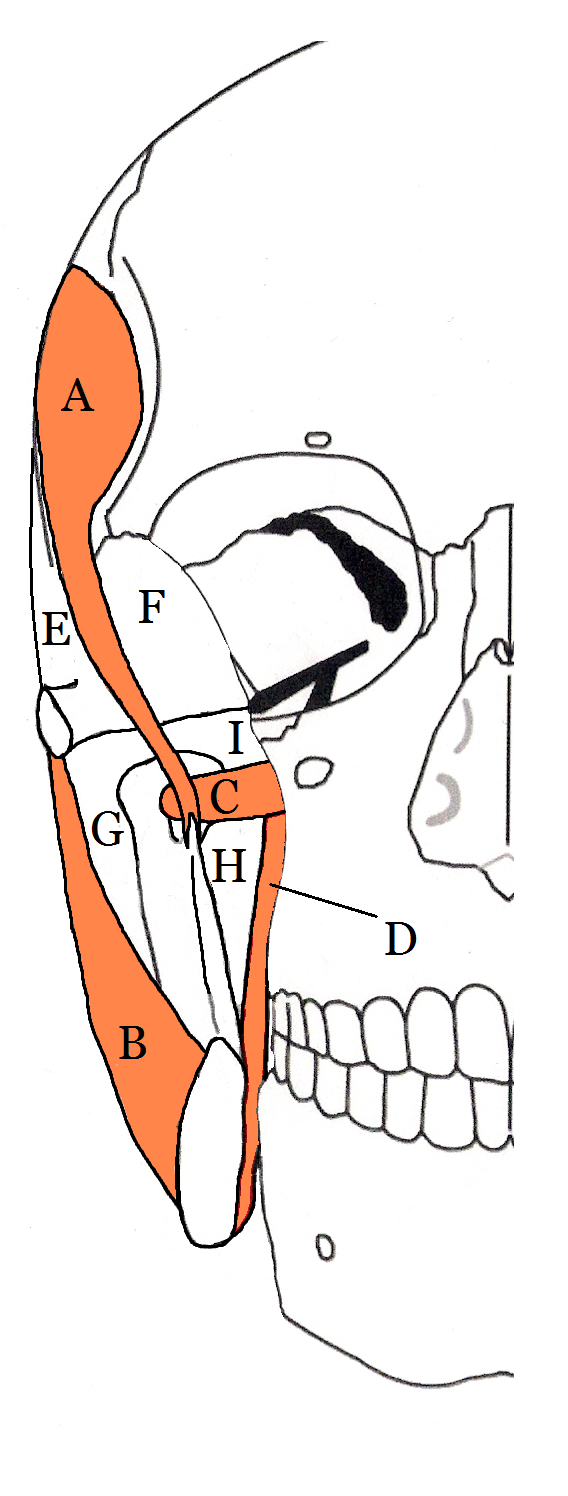
- The four compartents of the right masticator space. A Temporalis muscle, B Masseter muscle, C Lateral pterygoid muscle, D Medial ptaerygoid muscle, E Superficial temporal space, F Deep temporal space, G Submasseteric space, H Pterygomandibular space, I Approximate location of infratemporal space

The submasseterric space (also termed the masseteric space) is a fascial space of the head and neck (sometimes also termed fascial spaces or tissue spaces). It is a potential space in the face over the angle of the jaw, and is paired on each side. It is located between the lateral aspect of the mandible and the medial aspect of the masseter muscle and its investing fascia. The term is derived from sub- meaning "under" in Latin and masseteric which refers to the masseter muscle. The submasseteric space is one of the four compartments of the masticator space. Sometimes the submasseteric space is described as a series of spaces, created because the masseter muscle has multiple insertions that cover most of the lateral surface of the ramus of the mandible.

== Structure ==
=== Anatomic boundaries ===
The boundaries of each submasseteric space are:

- the anterior margin of the masseter muscle anteriorly,
- the parotid gland posteriorly,
- the zygomatic arch superiorly,
- the inferior border of the mandible inferiorly,
- the lateral surface of the mandibular ramus medially (the submasseteric space is superficial to the mandible),
- the masseter muscle laterally (the submasseteric space is deep to masseter).

=== Communications ===
The communications of each submasseteric space are:

- to the buccal space anteriorly,
- to the pterygomandibular space (around the posterior margin of the mandibular ramus to its medial surface) and the parotid space posteriorly,
- to the superficial temporal space superiorly.

=== Contents ===
In health, the space contains:

- the masseteric artery and vein.

== Clinical significance ==
Submasseteric abscesses are relatively rare, and may be confused with a parotid abscess or parotitis. They tend to be chronic. The submasseteric space may be involved by infections that spread from the buccal space. Sometimes mandibular fractures in the region of the angle of the mandible may cause an infection of the submasseteric space. The signs and symptoms of a submasseteric abscess may include marked trismus (i.e. difficulty opening the mouth, since the masseter elevates the mandible and it becomes restricted) and swelling in the region of the masseter muscle. The treatment of a submasseteric space infection is usually by surgical incision and drainage, and the incision is placed intra-orally (inside the mouth) or both intra and extra-orally if other parts of the masticator space are involved.

=== Odontogenic infections ===
The submasseteric space is sometimes involved by the spread of odontogenic infections, such as a pericoronal abscess associated with an impacted mandibular third molar (lower wisdom tooth) when the apices of the tooth lie very close to or within the space.

== Additional images ==
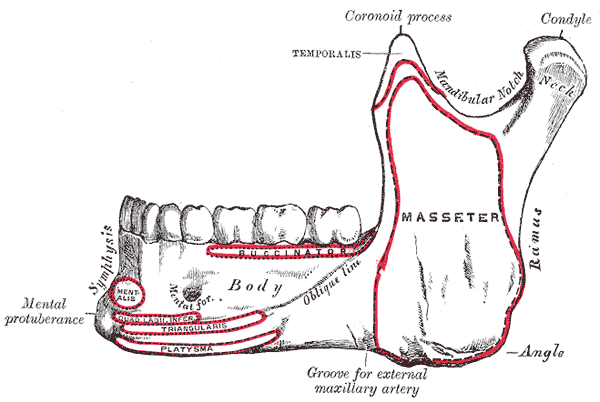
Diagram showing lateral surface of the mandible and the area of insertion of the masseter muscle on the mandibular ramus.

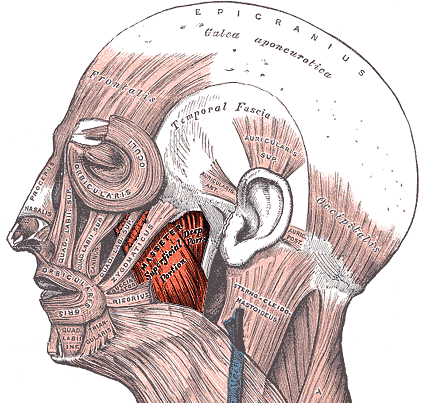
The left masseter muscle (red highlight), shown partially covered by superficial muscles such as the platysma muscle, the zygomaticus major muscle and the zygomaticus minor muscle
