= Infratemporal space =

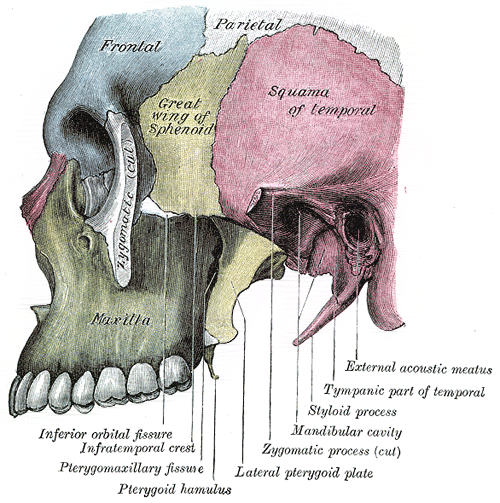
- Lateral view of skull, with part of the zygomatic complex removed. The infratemporal space is inferior to the base of skull and lateral to the lateral pterygoid plate.

The infratemporal space (also termed the infra-temporal space or the infra-temporal portion of the deep temporal space) is a fascial space of the head and neck (sometimes also termed fascial spaces or tissue spaces). It is a potential space in the side of the head, and is paired on either side. It is located posterior to the maxilla, between the lateral pterygoid plate of the sphenoid bone medially and by the base of skull superiorly. The term is derived from infra- meaning below and temporal which refers to the temporalis muscle.

The infratemporal space is the inferior portion of the deep temporal space, which is one of the four compartments of the masticator space, along with the pterygomandibular space, the submasseteric space and the superficial temporal space. The deep temporal space is separated from the pterygomandibular space by the lateral pterygoid muscle inferiorly and from the superficial temporal space by the temporalis muscle laterally. The deep temporal space and the superficial temporal space together make up the temporal spaces.

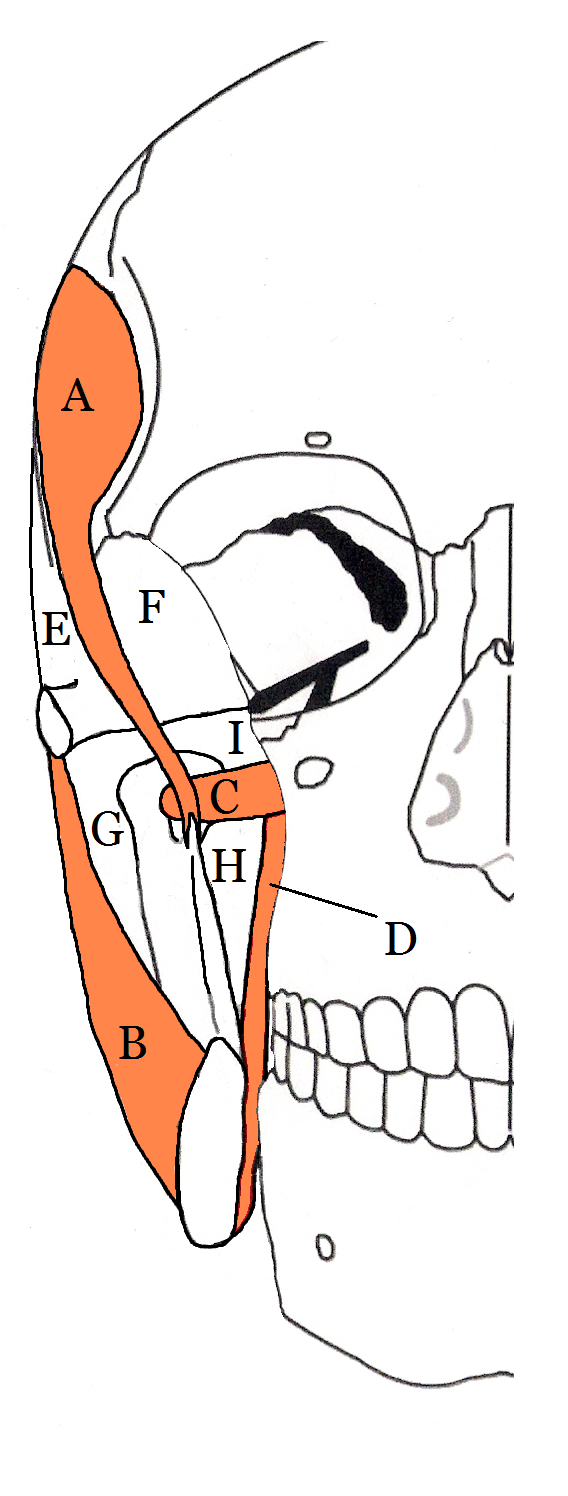
The four compartents of the right masticator space. A Temporalis muscle, B Masseter muscle, C Lateral pterygoid muscle, D Medial ptaerygoid muscle, E Superficial temporal space, F Deep temporal space, G Submasseteric space, H Pterygomandibular space, I Approximate location of infratemporal space.

== Location and structure ==
=== Anatomic boundaries ===
The boundaries of the infratemporal space are:

- the greater wing of the sphenoid bone superiorly
- the pterygomandibular space inferiorly
- the infra-temporal surface of the maxilla anteriorly,
- the lateral pterygoid plate, part of the lateral pterygoid muscle and lateral pharyngeal wall medially

=== Communications ===
The communications of the infratemporal space are:

- the pterygomandibular space inferiorly,
- the buccal space anteriorly and inferiorly,
- to the cavernous sinus via the pterygoid plexus of veins.

=== Contents ===
The contents of the infratemporal space are:

- branches of the maxillary artery,
- the pterygoid venous plexus.

== Clinical relevance ==
Infections of the infratemporal space are rare. They may be significant however, as it is possible for infection to spread via emissary veins from the pterygoid plexus to the cavernous sinus, which may result in cavernous sinus thrombosis, a rare but life-threatening condition. The signs and symptoms of an infratemporal space infection are swelling of the face in the region of the sigmoid notch, swelling of the mouth in the region of the maxillary tuberosity and marked trismus (difficulty opening the mouth), since some of the muscles of mastication are restricted by the swelling. Treatment of an abscess of this space is usually by surgical incision and drainage, with the incision being placed on the face (a small horizontal incision posterior to the junction of the temporal and frontal process of the zygomatic bone. or both on the face and inside the mouth.

=== Odontogenic infection ===
The spread of odontogenic infections may sometimes involve the infratemporal space. The most likely causative tooth is the maxillary third molar (upper wisdom tooth).
