= Intraoral dental sinus =

Oral lesion

An intraoral dental sinus is an abnormal channel that forms between a periapical infection and the oral cavity, allowing pus to drain into the mouth. It is a common consequence of chronic odontogenic infections, typically resulting from untreated dental caries, pulpal necrosis, or failed endodontic treatment. The condition often presents as a small, erythematous nodule or an opening on the gingiva or alveolar mucosa, which may intermittently discharge purulent material. While patients may experience discomfort during the initial infection phase, pain often subsides once the sinus tract establishes drainage, leading to delayed diagnosis and persistent low-grade infection.

The etiology of intraoral dental sinuses is primarily linked to periapical abscesses, which develop when bacterial infections from the root canal system extend into periapical tissues. The path of sinus tract formation is influenced by anatomical factors such as bone density and muscle attachments, determining whether the infection drains intraorally or extraorally. If left untreated, the infection may progress to more severe complications, including osteomyelitis, cellulitis, or deep fascial space infections.

Correct diagnosis is essential, as intraoral dental sinuses can be misdiagnosed as periodontal abscesses or mucosal lesions of non-odontogenic origin. Clinicians often use radiographic imaging, such as periapical radiographs or cone-beam computed tomography (CBCT), along with gutta-percha tracing to determine the source of infection. Management involves addressing the underlying cause through root canal treatment or tooth extraction, ensuring complete resolution of the infection and closure of the sinus tract.

This review discusses the pathophysiology, clinical presentation, diagnostic approaches, and management strategies for intraoral dental sinuses, emphasizing their significance in dental practice and the importance of timely intervention.

== Aetiology ==
An intraoral sinus tract is a pathological communication between a chronic dental infection and the oral cavity, allowing purulent material to drain. It typically arises as a response to persistent odontogenic infections, where the body attempts to relieve built-up pressure by creating an outlet for drainage. The formation of an intraoral sinus tract depends on various factors, including the location of the infected tooth, the position of its apex relative to muscle attachments, the virulence of bacteria, and the host's immune response Understanding the underlying causes of intraoral sinus tracts is crucial for proper diagnosis and treatment, as failure to address the infection can lead to recurrent drainage and further complications.

=== Periapical infections ===
Periapical abscesses, the most common cause of intraoral sinus tracts, result from pulpal necrosis due to untreated caries, dental procedures, or trauma. Anaerobic bacteria trigger an immune response, leading to periapical lesions such as abscesses, granulomas, or cysts. A periapical abscess causes pus accumulation, which drains through a sinus tract into the oral cavity, typically via the gingiva or vestibule. The drainage pathway depends on factors such as tooth location, the position of the apex relative to muscular attachments, bacterial virulence, host immunity, and resistance from surrounding structures. The opening of the sinus tract, known as the stomata, is usually singular but may be multiple in conditions like chronic suppurative osteomyelitis. In some cases, infection extends extraorally or into the maxillary sinus. Once drainage occurs, acute pain subsides, but the sinus tract persists until the infection is treated.

=== Periodontal infections ===
Periodontal infections can also contribute to the development of intraoral sinus tracts. A periodontal abscess occurs when bacteria invade deep periodontal pockets, leading to localized infection and pus formation. Unlike periapical abscesses, which originate from pulpal necrosis, periodontal abscesses arise from the supporting structures of the teeth, such as the periodontal ligament and alveolar bone. Several factors increase the risk of periodontal abscess formation, including deep periodontal pockets, root grooves, external root resorption, and the presence of dental calculus. In some cases, periodontal abscesses may form independently of periodontal disease, such as when foreign objects become lodged within the gingival tissues. The presence of an intraoral sinus tract in such cases indicates a chronic infection that requires both mechanical debridement and infection control.

=== Traumatic injuries ===
Trauma to the teeth, even in the absence of visible fractures or caries, can lead to the development of an intraoral sinus tract. Accidental trauma, such as biting on a hard object, can cause ischemic infarction of the pulp by disrupting the apical blood supply. When this occurs, the pulp undergoes necrosis, creating an environment for bacterial invasion and subsequent infection. Over time, the infection spreads to the periapical region, leading to abscess formation and sinus tract development. Pulp necrosis is the most common complication following dental trauma and is often associated with apical periodontitis. Since traumatic injuries may not cause immediate symptoms, the resulting infection can remain undiagnosed until the sinus tract appears as a draining lesion in the oral cavity.

=== Endodontic failure ===
Failed endodontic treatment is another significant cause of intraoral sinus tracts. Even after root canal therapy, residual bacteria may persist within the root canal system, particularly in lateral canals, apical deltas, or accessory canals that were not adequately disinfected; In some cases, sealer extrusion into the periradicular tissues may lead to persistent inflammation, preventing proper healing. If the endodontic treatment fails to eliminate the infection completely, a sinus tract may form as a chronic drainage route. A thorough understanding of both typical and atypical root canal anatomy is crucial for successful endodontic treatment. Post-treatment failure often arises from the inability to locate, clean and shape, or obturate all canals within the root canal system. Additionally, lateral canals containing necrotic debris and inflammatory cells can sustain infection, even in cases where apical healing has been achieved.

== Pathophysiology ==
=== Initiation: Bacterial invasion and pulp necrosis ===
The process begins with bacterial invasion of the dental pulp, usually secondary to caries, trauma, or restorative failures. Once bacteria reach the pulp, they trigger an inflammatory response, leading to pulpitis. If left untreated, the inflammation progresses to pulpal necrosis, creating an ideal anaerobic environment for bacterial proliferation.

The most commonly implicated microorganisms in dental infections include facultative anaerobes such as Streptococcus species and obligate anaerobes such as Prevotella, Fusobacterium, and Porphyromonas* species. These bacteria release toxins and enzymes (e.g., collagenases, hyaluronidases) that degrade the periapical tissues, allowing the infection to spread beyond the root apex.

=== Periapical extension and abscess formation ===
As pulpal necrosis progresses, bacteria and their byproducts extend through the apical foramen into the periapical tissues, causing periapical periodontitis. This leads to the recruitment of immune cells (macrophages, neutrophils, and lymphocytes) that attempt to contain the infection. However, persistent bacterial activity can overwhelm the immune response, leading to:

- Periapical granuloma: Chronic inflammation results in the formation of granulation tissue, rich in fibroblasts and inflammatory cells.
- Periapical abscess: Pus accumulation occurs as neutrophils die while attempting to combat bacterial invasion. The abscess can expand, leading to local bone resorption

=== Sinus tract formation: Pathway of least resistance ===
As the infection progresses, pus accumulation generates increased pressure within the periapical region. This pressure follows the path of least resistance, perforating the alveolar bone and soft tissue. The sinus tract can develop in different directions depending on anatomical factors.

- Intraoral sinus tract (most common): The infection drains into the oral cavity, usually appearing as a soft, erythematous papule on the attached gingiva or mucosa.
- Extraoral sinus tract (cutaneous fistula): If the infection follows an external path, it can present as a skin lesion on the face or neck, often misdiagnosed as a dermatological condition.

=== Chronic inflammation and bone involvement ===
If left untreated, the persistent infection can result in:

- Osteomyelitis: Spread of infection into the jawbone, causing necrosis and sequestration of bone tissue.
- Cellulitis: Diffuse bacterial infection extending into soft tissues, potentially leading to Ludwig's angina in severe cases.
- Chronic granulomatous inflammation: Continuous immune activation results in fibrosis and tissue remodeling, making the lesion resistant to healing.

=== Resolution and healing ===
Definitive treatment requires removal of the source of infection, either through endodontic therapy (root canal treatment) or tooth extraction. Once the infection is controlled, the sinus tract spontaneously closes within weeks. Failure to address the primary cause results in recurrent infections and progressive tissue destruction.

== Clinical features ==
An intraoral dental sinus, is a pathway formed by the spread of infection from a dental source, typically a periapical abscess. It is most commonly found in the gingiva or alveolar mucosa near the apex of the infected tooth, though it can sometimes open at a distant site depending on the path of least resistance for drainage. Clinically, it appears as a small, raised, red, or yellowish papule or pustule with a central punctum, often surrounded by inflamed or erythematous tissue. Pus discharge may be intermittent or continuous, sometimes causing a foul taste or odor. Pain and discomfort vary, with the sinus often being painless if it drains effectively, though pain can occur if the drainage is blocked. Localized swelling and redness of the gums or soft tissues are common, and the affected tooth may exhibit tenderness to percussion or biting, discoloration, or a history of previous pain and swelling. Radiographic findings typically show periapical radiolucency around the affected tooth root, and the sinus tract's path may be visible with contrast or tracing techniques. Associated findings often include a non-vital tooth, deep caries, failed root canal treatment, or periapical pathology, sometimes accompanied by tooth mobility or tenderness.

== Diagnosis ==
The diagnosis of an intraoral dental sinus tract relies on a thorough clinical evaluation and radiographic imaging to pinpoint the source of infection and rule out other oral pathologies.These sinus tracts typically develop as a result of chronic periapical infections, which may arise from untreated dental caries, pulpal necrosis, or periodontal disease. Since they can sometimes mimic other mucosal conditions, careful differential diagnosis is essential to ensure appropriate treatment.

=== Clinical examination ===
Patients with intraoral sinus tracts often report a persistent small opening in the gingiva or alveolar mucosa, sometimes accompanied by pus discharge and mild tenderness. The affected tooth may not always be painful due to the continuous drainage of exudate, which prevents pressure buildup.

Affected teeth clinical features include:

- A history of recurrent intraoral swelling or discharge.
- The presence of a non-healing fistula near the suspected tooth.
- Variable responses to percussion and vitality tests, which can help differentiate between vital and non-vital teeth.
- Potential association with localized bone loss, deep periodontal pockets, or tooth mobility in advanced cases.

One of the most reliable diagnostic methods for confirming the odontogenic origin is sinus tract tracing, where a radiopaque material, such as gutta-percha, is inserted into the tract. A follow-up radiograph helps to confirm the origin in the affected tooth , which typically leads back to a necrotic tooth or an area of chronic periapical inflammation.

=== Radiographic investigations ===
Radiographic imaging plays a crucial role in confirming the extent of periapical pathology and ensuring an accurate diagnosis. Common imaging modalities include:

- Periapical radiographs (PA): Can highlight periapical radiolucencies, indicating areas of chronic inflammation or infection.
- Panoramic radiographs (OPG): Useful for evaluating multiple teeth and broader anatomical structures.
- Cone-beam computed tomography (CBCT): Provides a three-dimensional visualization of the affected area, particularly valuable in cases of the maxillary sinus or adjacent spaces.

== Differential diagnosis ==
Intraoral dental sinus tracts must be distinguished from various conditions with similar presentations. A periodontal abscess arises from deep periodontal pockets and presents with localized swelling and bleeding, unlike sinus tracts from periapical infections. Non-odontogenic cutaneous sinus tracts, caused by actinomycosis or tuberculosis, often involve systemic symptoms. Oroantral fistula (OAF) results from maxillary sinus communication post-extraction, causing nasal regurgitation. Other conditions include salivary gland fistulas, soft tissue neoplasms, and chronic mucosal ulcers.

== Treatment and management ==
Firstly, the severity of the infection must be established with a thorough history and clinical examination as odontogenic infections can spread to high risk spaces and can lead to sepsis. The main aim for managing the presence of a dental sinus is to drain the pus and remove the source of infection achieved by root canal treatment or extracting the associated tooth. Antibiotics may also be used as an adjunct to conventional treatment for instance if drainage cannot be immediately achieved or there are systemic signs of infection.

Root canal treatment can be a treatment option for patients with pulpitis or periapical infections due to dental decay or trauma. Root canal treatment aims to preserve the natural remaining tooth and remove the source of infection. This treatment involves firstly removing the pulp inside the tooth, followed by cleaning, disinfecting and shaping the root canals prior to being sealed with a filling material.

Extraction of the tooth may be required if the tooth is unrestorable. Simple extractions can be performed under local anaesthetic by a dentist, or surgical techniques may be necessary for more complex cases. By extracting the affected tooth, the source of infection is eliminated.

Incision and drainage are required to manage localised abscesses or fluctuant swellings related to odontogenic infections. It is required to remove the infection and relieve the pressure. Local anaesthetic is provided, and a small incision is made at the site to allow pus and debris to exit allowing relief of pain and infection.

Antibacterial drugs may be prescribed in conjunction with but not as an alternative to other appropriate treatment as described above for oral infections. They may be required if treatment must be delayed, immunocompromised patients and those with certain conditions, including Paget's disease or diabetes. Rarer infections such as bacterial sialadenitis and infections of the fascial spaces such as Ludwig's angina involve antibiotics and specialist care within a hospital.

Dental infections can be difficult to manage acutely. If left untreated they can be very painful and pose a significant risk of spreading to areas such as the deep neck space or intracranial sinuses. Timely dentist appointments for dental care interventions and oral antibiotics are often sufficient for treating a dental abscess. In the absence of immediate treatment by a dentist, to reduce the pain and pressure of a dental abscess appropriate self-care advice can be followed. Including, using a soft toothbrush, consuming soft foods, eating on the other side of the mouth, avoiding food or drinks that are too hot or cold and the safe use of analgesics to relieve symptoms if present. Treatment from a dentist should be sought as soon as possible as definitive treatment can only be given by a dentist as medication will not remove the source of infection and serious complications can occur if not correctly treated. If using analgesics do not exceed the recommended or prescribed dose. Avoid taking combinations of analgesic products at the same time without checking the packaging or consulting a healthcare professional. Patients must be reminded that analgesics should not be used to delay dental treatment.

== Complications ==
Intraoral dental sinuses derived from chronic dental infections present significant diagnostic and therapeutic challenges. They mostly stem from periapical lesions that may mimic other oral pathologies and complicate diagnosis. These sinus tracts can result in persistent drainage and uncomfortable situations. The infections may lead to the spreading beyond the oral cavity and have profound respective complications, with infections potentially spreading beyond the dental area, leading to severe complications such as osteomyelitis or cellulitis. Accurate diagnosis typically requires radiographic imaging, and in some cases, the use of gutta percha points to trace the origin of the sinus tract. Effective management focuses on addressing the underlying dental infection through endodontic treatment or extraction to achieve resolution and prevent recurrence.

Intraoral dental sinus (parulis/gumboil) manifests as a soft, erythematous papule on the alveolar process, frequently associated with a nonvital tooth and dental abscess. It may resemble a persistent mouth ulcer that drains pus, leaving a foul taste. If untreated, dental infections can extend into the sinus cavity, causing sinusitis and related symptoms such as sinus pain, pressure, nasal congestion, discharge, post-nasal drip, and headaches, especially when bending forward.

Several serious complications can arise from these infections. Sinus perforation may occur if the bony membrane is damaged during dental procedures, creating an opening that can lead to infection. An oroantral communication (OAC) is an unnatural space that forms between the maxillary sinus and oral cavity following extraction of antral teeth, infection, or several different complications. It can develop, potentially progressing to oroantral fistula (OAF) or chronic sinus disease if not properly managed. Severe infections can also result in life-threatening conditions like Ludwig's angina, affecting the submandibular, submental, and sublingual regions, which can obstruct breathing and swallowing. Additionally, osteomyelitis, a bone infection, may cause subcutaneous subperiosteal abscess, sinocutaneous fistula, and even orbital or cerebral spread. Odontogenic sinusitis (ODS) poses a risk of ocular, cerebral, and osseous complications.

Other consequences include tooth devitalization, where dental procedures or infections damage the pulp, requiring further treatment. Furthermore, conditions like dry mouth (xerostomia), sometimes induced by cancer therapies, can exacerbate oral health issues by increasing the risk of oral infections, difficulty swallowing, diminished taste and speech, and overall oral discomfort. Proper identification and management of these conditions are crucial to preventing severe outcomes and ensuring effective treatment.

== Conclusion ==
In conclusion, intraoral dental sinuses are a significant clinical manifestation of chronic odontogenic infections, often stemming from periapical abscesses or periodontal issues. They are typically characterized by intermittent or continuous drainage, with the potential for pain, swelling, and localized discomfort. The pathophysiology involves bacterial invasion, leading to pulpal necrosis and periapical extension, which ultimately results in the formation of a sinus tract to relieve pressure. Treatment primarily focuses on removing the source of infection through root canal therapy or tooth extraction, with adjunctive use of antibiotics if necessary.

Complications can arise if left untreated, including the spread of infection to adjacent structures, leading to osteomyelitis, cellulitis, or even life-threatening conditions such as Ludwig's angina. Accurate diagnosis, often aided by radiographic imaging, is crucial for effective management, which aims to resolve the infection and prevent recurrence. Furthermore, complications such as oroantral communication or sinusitis may also develop, highlighting the importance of prompt treatment. By addressing the underlying dental issues and preventing further spread, the majority of patients can achieve resolution and prevent more serious outcomes.
