= Pterygomandibular space =

Fascial space of the head and neck

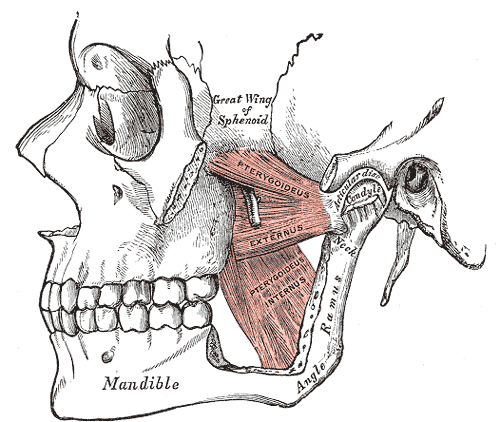
- Diagram showing left medial and lateral pterygoid muscles. Part of the zygomatic arch and the ramus of the mandible have been cut away. The pterygomandibular space lies between the lateral surface of medial pterygoid and the medial surface of the mandibular ramus.

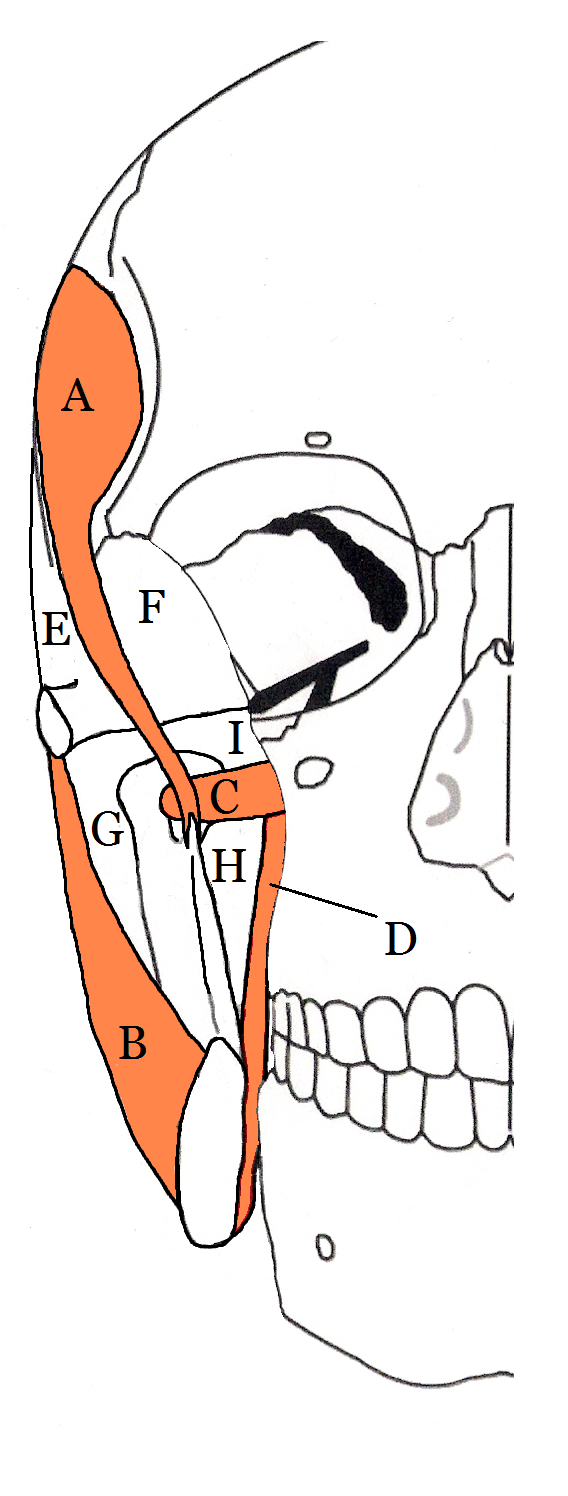
- The four compartents of the right masticator space. A Temporalis muscle, B Masseter muscle, C Lateral pterygoid muscle, D Medial ptaerygoid muscle, E Superficial temporal space, F Deep temporal space, G Submasseteric space, H Pterygomandibular space, I Approximate location of infratemporal space

The pterygomandibular space is a fascial space of the head and neck (sometimes also termed fascial spaces or tissue spaces). It is a potential space in the head and is paired on each side. It is located between the medial pterygoid muscle and the medial surface of the ramus of the mandible. The pterygomandibular space is one of the four compartments of the masticator space.

== Location and structure ==
=== Anatomic boundaries ===
The boundaries of each pterygomandibular space are:

- the posterior border of the buccal space anteriorly
- the parotid gland posteriorly
- the lateral pterygoid muscle superiorly
- the inferior border of the mandible (lingual surface) inferiorly
- the medial pterygoid muscle medially (the space is superficial to medial pterygoid)
- the ascending ramus of the mandible laterally (the space is deep to the ramus of the mandible)

=== Communications ===
The communications of each pterygomandibular space are:

- to the buccal space anteriorly
- to the lateral pharyngeal space and peritonsillar space medially (around the medial pterygoid muscle).
- to the submasseteric space laterally (around the ramus of the mandible)
- to the parotid space posteriorly
- to the deep temporal/infratemporal space superiorly

=== Contents ===
In health, the space contains:

- the mandibular division of the trigeminal nerve,
- the inferior alveolar artery and vein,
- the sphenomandibular ligament.

== Clinical relevance ==
The pterygomandibular space is the area where local anesthetic solution is deposited during an inferior alveolar nerve block, a common procedure used to anesthetize the distribution of the inferior alveolar nerve. Rarely, pathogenic micro-organisms from the mouth may be seeded into the pterygomandibular space during this injection and cause a needle tract infection of the space. It is also occasionally reported that the needle breaks off and is retained in the pterygomandibular space during this injection. Minor oral surgery is then required to remove the fractured needle. Due to its high vascularity, injections into the pterygomandibular space carry a high risk of intravascular injection (injecting into a blood vessel). Another possible complication of an inferior alveolar nerve block occurs when the needle is placed too deep, passing through the pterygomandibular space and into the parotid gland behind. Branches of the facial nerve (which gives the motor supply to the muscles of facial expression) run through the substance of the parotid gland and so this is manifest as a transient facial palsy. The pterygomandibular space is one of the possible spaces into which a tooth may be displaced into during dental extraction, e.g. of a maxillary wisdom tooth. A mandibular fracture in the angle region may also be the cause of a pterygomandibular space infection.

The signs and symptoms of an isolated pterygomandiublar infection may include trismus (difficulty opening the mouth), however there is not usually any externally visible facial swelling. Intra-orally, there may be swelling and erythema (redness) of the anterior tonsillar pillar (the Palatoglossal arch) and deviation of the uvula to the unaffected side. The airway may be compressed. Treatment is by surgical incision and drainage, and the incision may be placed inside the mouth or two incisions may be used, one inside the mouth and one outside.

=== Odontogenic infections ===
Odontogenic infections may spread to involve the pterygomandibular space, and the most common teeth responsible for this are the mandibular second and third molar teeth.
