= Combined periodontic-endodontic lesions =

Type of gum disease

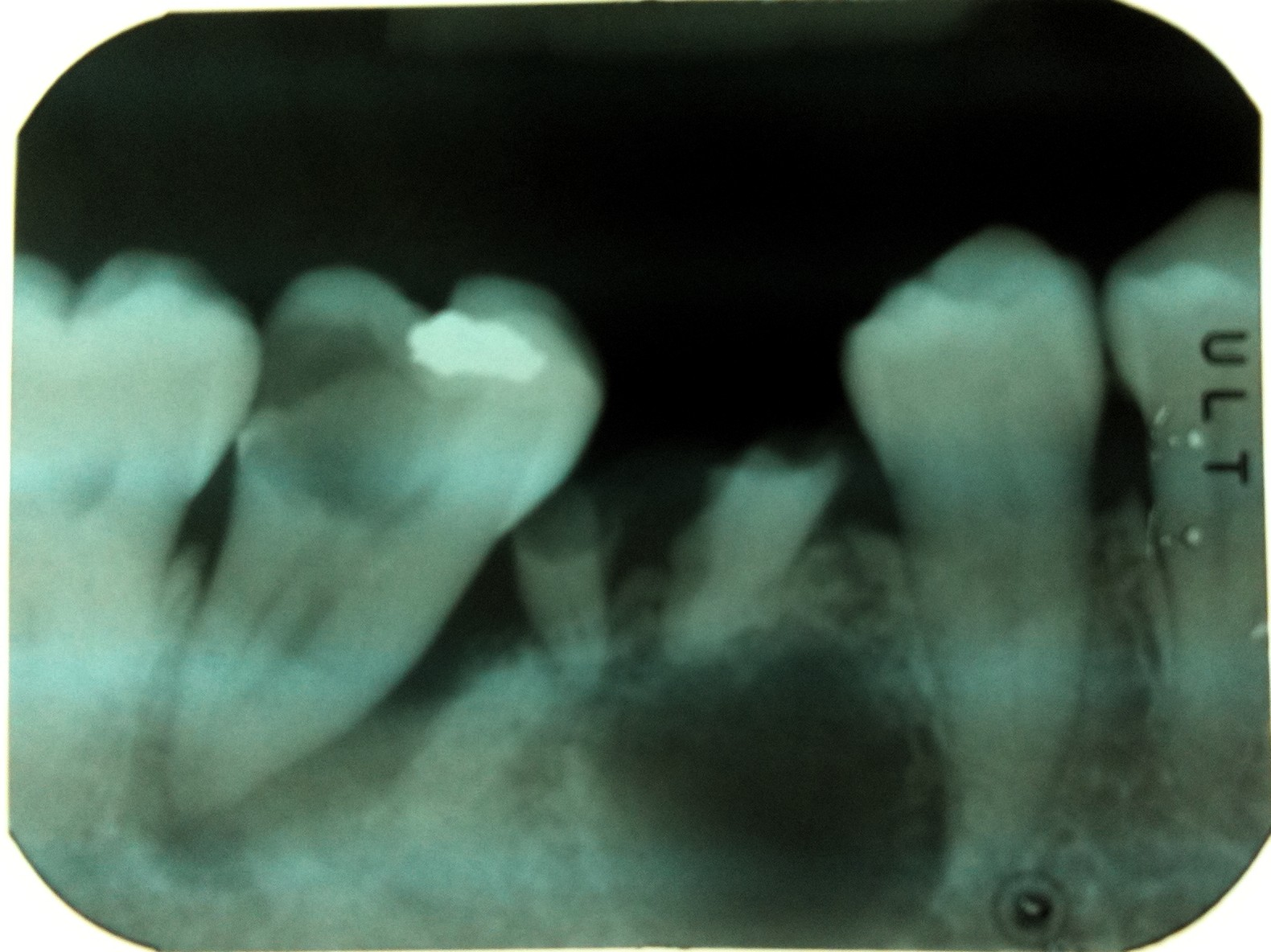
Periapical readiograph of lower right teeth, showing a large carious lesion in the distal of the lower right second molar. The same tooth also has an extensive periodontal defect. At this stage, without further information, it is difficult to tell which process has occurred first and lead to the death of the pulp.

Combined periodontic-endodontic lesions are localized, circumscribed areas of bacterial infection originating from either dental pulp, periodontal tissues surrounding the involved tooth or teeth or both.

== Cause ==
Combined periodontic-endodontic lesions take the form of abscesses and can originate from either or both of two distinct locations and may be informally subclassified as follows:

1. Endo-Perio: infection from the pulp tissue within a tooth may spread into the bone immediately surrounding the tip, or apex, or the tooth root, forming a periapical abscess. This infection may then proliferate coronally to communicate with the margin of the alveolar bone and the oral cavity by spreading through the periodontal ligament.
2. Perio-Endo: infection from a periodontal pocket may proliferate via accessory canals into the root canal of the affected tooth, leading to pulpal inflammation. Accessory canals may not be big enough to allow bacterial penetration, periodontal disease must reach the apex to induce an endodontic lesion.

Neither the prognosis, treatment nor expected treatment outcome depend on the source of the infection.

A combined lesion may also be the result of a fractured tooth.

== Treatment ==
Treatment includes conventional endodontic therapy followed by conventional periodontal therapy. If the lesion is deemed too severe for treatment, the involved tooth may require extraction.
