= Odontogenic infection =

Infection originating in a tooth

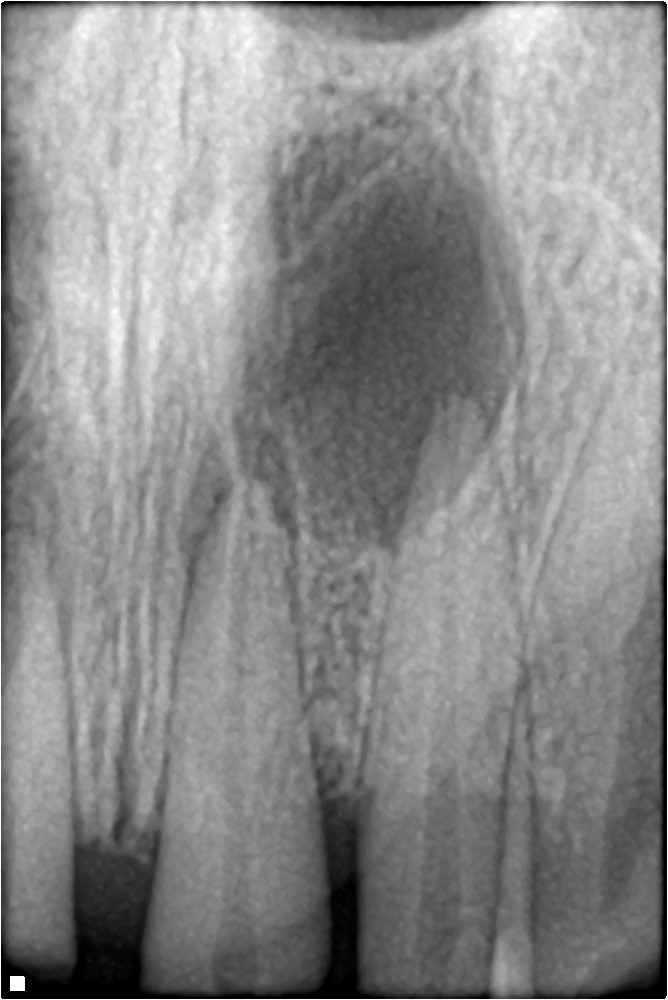
Periapical radiograph showing peri-radicular radiolucency and bone loss caused by an odontogenic infection under the roots of two anterior teeth in a 30-year-old patient

An odontogenic infection is an infection that originates within a tooth or in the closely surrounding tissues. The term is derived from odonto- (Ancient Greek: ὀδούς, odoús – 'tooth') and -genic (Ancient Greek: -γενής, -γενῶς; -genḗs, -genôs – 'birth'). The most common causes for odontogenic infection to be established are dental caries, deep fillings, failed root canal treatments, periodontal disease, and pericoronitis. Odontogenic infection starts as localised infection and may remain localised to the region where it started, or spread into adjacent or distant areas.

It is estimated that 90–95% of all orofacial infections originate from the teeth or their supporting structures and are the most common infections in the oral and maxillofacial region. Odontogenic infections can be severe if not treated and are associated with mortality rate of 10 to 40%. Furthermore, about 70% of odontogenic infections occur as periapical inflammation, i.e. acute periapical periodontitis or a periapical abscess. The next most common form of odontogenic infection is the periodontal abscess. Despite being more common in underprivileged regions, odontogenic infections affect people from all over the world, even in developed countries.

== Odontogenic sinusitis ==
Sinusitis is inflammation of the paranasal air sinuses. Odontogenic sinusitis is an inflammatory condition of the paranasal sinuses that is the result of dental pathology, most often resulting from prior dentoalveolar procedures, infections of maxillary dentition, or maxillary dental trauma. Infections associated with teeth may be responsible for approximately 20% of cases of maxillary sinusitis. The cause of this situation is usually a periapical or periodontal infection of a maxillary posterior tooth, where the inflammatory exudate has eroded through the bone superiorly to drain into the maxillary sinus. Medical management and treatment of the underlying dental pathology remains a critical initial step in the treatment of odontogenic sinusitis, however recent literature suggests that a significant portion of patients may require endoscopic sinus surgery for successful disease resolution. Once an odontogenic infection involves the maxillary sinus, it is possible that it may then spread to the orbit or to the ethmoid sinus.

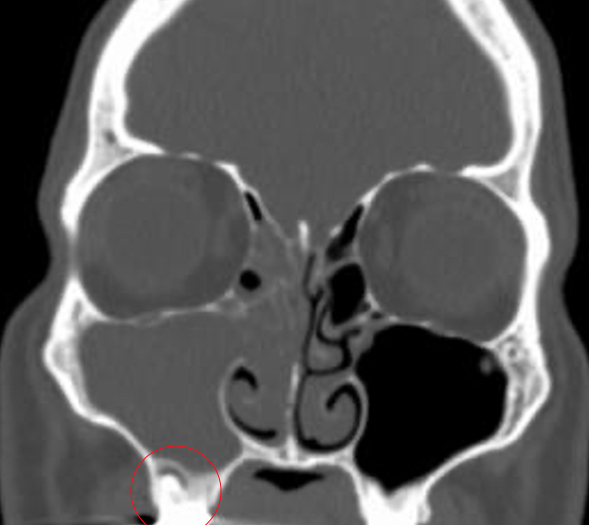
CT showing complete opacification of the right maxillary and right anterior ethmoid sinuses with associated involvement of the ostiomeatal unit

== Complications of Odontogenic Infection ==
Odontogenic infection can be managed relatively easily if treated in the early stages of infection. However, there are some factors which need to be taken in consideration when dealing with odontogenic infection. A major complicating factor for managing odontogenic infections is the host defence mechanism which can be impaired by systemic illnesses and certain medications. The table below shows the most common causes for an impaired defence mechanism.

Risk factors for complications
Systemic illness	Drugs related
Diabetes mellitus	Corticosteroid therapy
HIV, measles, chronic malaria, tuberculosis	Cytotoxic drugs
Hyperthyroidism/ Hypothyroidism	Excessive antibiotics
Liver disease, kidney failure, heart failure	Malnutrition
Blood dyscrasia, anaemia, sickle cell disease	Allergic reaction
Blood dyscrasia, anaemia, sickle cell disease	Alcohol use disorder
Blood dyscrasia, anaemia, sickle cell disease	Irradiation

If treatment is delayed, odontogenic infection can spread into adjacent tissues consequently leading to life-threatening conditions. Most commonly resulting in respiratory obstruction and sepsis, and less commonly endocarditis, necrotising fasciitis, spondylitis, brain abscess, descending mediastinitis, thoracic empyema, pleuropulmonary suppuration, aspiration pneumonia, pneumothorax, mandibular or cervical osteomyelitis, abscess of the carotid sheath and jugular thrombophlebitis, hematogenous dissemination to distant organs, and coagulation abnormalities. This concern, of distant or systemic infection originating from oral pathogens, is particularly significant in neutropenic patients, whose immune system is compromised. Therefore, dental preparation aimed at eliminating odontogenic infections is recommended before cytotoxic chemotherapy, hematopoietic stem cell transplantation, or CAR T-cell therapy, in which bone marrow suppression and a decline in white blood cell count are expected.
