= Fascial spaces of the head and neck =

Aspect of anatomy

Fascial spaces (also termed fascial tissue spaces or tissue spaces) are potential spaces that exist between the fasciae and underlying organs and other tissues. In health, these spaces do not exist; they are only created by pathology, e.g. the spread of pus or cellulitis in an infection. The fascial spaces can also be opened during the dissection of a cadaver. The fascial spaces are different from the fasciae themselves, which are bands of connective tissue that surround structures, e.g. muscles. The opening of fascial spaces may be facilitated by pathogenic bacterial release of enzymes which cause tissue lysis (e.g. hyaluronidase and collagenase). The spaces filled with loose areolar connective tissue may also be termed clefts. Other contents such as salivary glands, blood vessels, nerves and lymph nodes are dependent upon the location of the space. Those containing neurovascular tissue (nerves and blood vessels) may also be termed compartments.

Generally, the spread of infection is determined by barriers such as muscle, bone and fasciae. Pus moves by the path of least resistance, e.g. the fluid will more readily dissect apart loosely connected tissue planes, such the fascial spaces, than erode through bone or muscles. In the head and neck, potential spaces are primarily defined by the complex attachment of muscles, especially mylohyoid, buccinator, masseter, medial pterygoid, superior constrictor and orbicularis oris.

Infections involving fascial spaces of the head and neck may give varying signs and symptoms depending upon the spaces involved. Trismus (difficulty opening the mouth) is a sign that the muscles of mastication (the muscles that move the jaw) are involved. Dysphagia (difficulty swallowing) and dyspnoea (difficulty breathing) may be a sign that the airway is being compressed by the swelling.

== Classification ==
Different classifications are used. One method distinguishes four anatomic groups:

- The mandible and below
  - The buccal vestibule
  - The body of the mandible
  - The mental space
  - The submental space
  - The sublingual space
  - The submandibular space
- The cheek and lateral face
  - The buccal vestibule of the maxilla
  - The buccal space
  - The submasseteric space
  - The temporal space
- The pharyngeal and cervical areas
  - The pterygomandibular space
  - The parapharyngeal spaces
  - The cervical spaces
- The midface
  - The palate
  - The base of the upper lip
  - The canine spaces (infraorbital spaces)
  - The periorbital spaces

Since the hyoid bone is the most important anatomic structure in the neck that limits the spread of infection, the spaces can be classified according to their relation to the hyoid bone:

- Suprahyoid (above the hyoid)
- Infrahyoid (below the hyoid)
- Fascial spaces traversing the length of the neck

In oral and maxillofacial surgery, the fascial spaces are almost always of relevance due to the spread of odontogenic infections. As such, the spaces can also be classified according to their relation to the upper and lower teeth, and whether infection may directly spread into the space (primary space), or must spread via another space (secondary space):

- Primary maxillary spaces
  - Canine space
  - Buccal space
  - Infratemporal space
- Primary mandibular spaces
  - Submental space
  - Buccal space
  - Submandibular space
  - Sublingual space
  - Submasseteric space
- Cervical spaces

== Perimandibular spaces ==
The submaxillary space is a historical term for the combination of the submandibular, submental and sublingual spaces, which in modern practice are referred to separately or collectively termed the perimandibular spaces. The term submaxillary may be confusing to modern students and clinicians since these spaces are located below the mandible, but historically the maxilla and mandible together were termed "maxillae", and sometimes the mandible was termed the "inferior maxilla". Sometimes the term submaxillary space is used synonymously with submandibular space. Confusion exists, as some sources describe the sublingual and the submandibular spaces as compartments of the "submandibular space".

== Masticator space ==
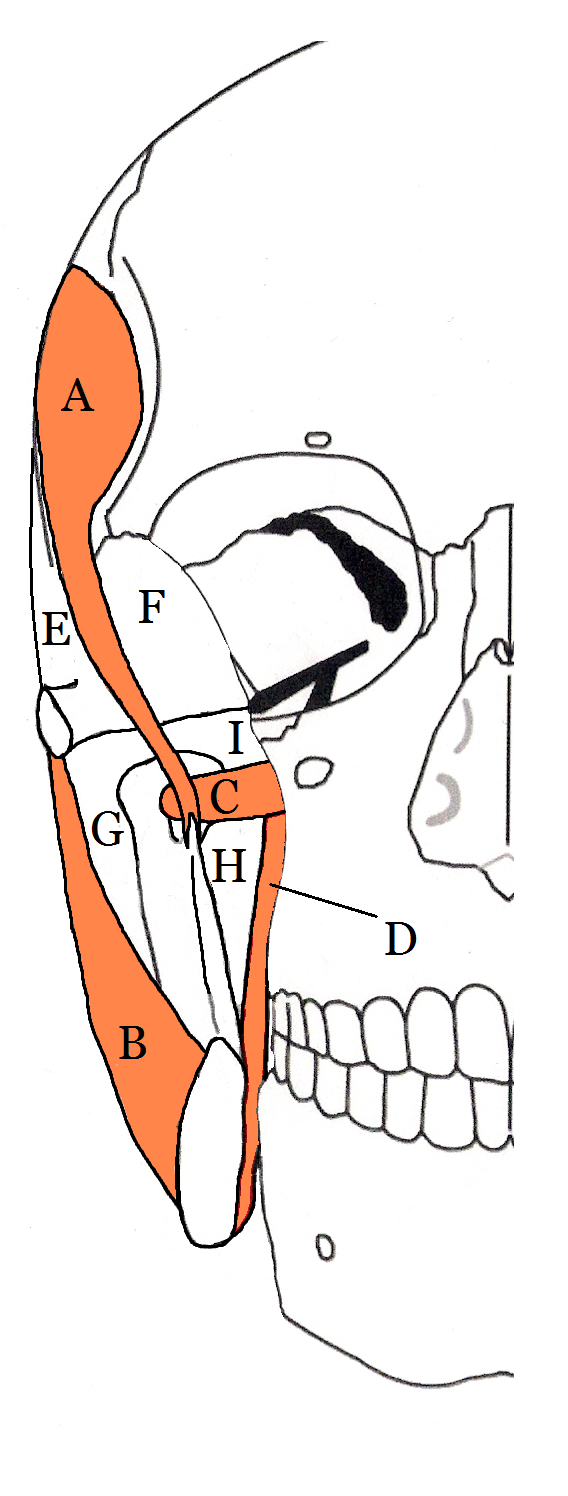
The four compartents of the right masticator space. A Temporalis muscle, B Masseter muscle, C Lateral pterygoid muscle, D Medial ptaerygoid muscle, E Superficial temporal space, F Deep temporal space, G Submasseteric space, H Pterygomandibular space, I Approximate location of infratemporal space.

This term is sometimes used, and is a collective name for the submasseteric (masseteric), pterygomandibular, superficial temporal and deep temporal spaces. The infratemporal space is the inferior portion of the deep temporal space. The superficial temporal and the deep temporal spaces are sometimes together called the temporal spaces. The masticator spaces are paired structures on either side of the head. The muscles of mastication are enclosed in a layer of fascia, formed by cervical fascia ascending from the neck which divides at the inferior border of the mandible to envelope the area. Each masticator space also contains the sections of the mandibular division of the trigeminal nerve and the internal maxillary artery.

The masticator space could therefore be described as a potential space with four separate compartments. Infections usually only occupy one of these compartments, but severe or long standing infections can spread to involve the entire masticator space. The compartments of the masticator space are located on either side of the mandibular ramus and on either side of the temporalis muscle.

=== Submasseteric space ===
This is also referred to as the masseter space or the superifical masticator space. The submasseteric space is logically located under (deep to) the masseter muscle, created by the insertions of masseter onto the lateral surface of the mandibular ramus. Submasseteric abscesses are rare and are associated with marked trismus.

=== Pterygomandibular space ===
The pterygomandibular space lies between the medial side of the ramus of the mandible and the lateral surface of the medial pterygoid muscle.

=== Deep temporal space (infra-temporal space) ===
The infra-temporal space is the inferior portion of the deep temporal space.

== History ==
Modern understanding of the fascial spaces of the head and neck developed from the landmark research of Grodinsky and Holyoke in the 1930s. They injected a dye into cadavers to simulate pus. Their hypothesis was that infection in the head and neck mainly spread by hydrostatic pressure. This is now accepted to be true for most infections in the head and neck, with the exception of actinomycosis which tends to burrow into the skin, and mycotuberculoid infections which tend to spread via the lymphatics.
