= Potential space =

Space between two anatomically adjacent structures that are normally pressed together

In anatomy, a potential space is a space between two adjacent structures that are normally pressed together (directly apposed). Many anatomic spaces are potential spaces, which means that they are potential rather than realized (with their realization being dynamic according to physiologic or pathophysiologic events). In other words, they are like an empty plastic bag that has not been opened (two walls collapsed against each other; no interior volume until opened) or a balloon that has not been inflated. The pleural space, between the visceral and parietal pleura of the lung, is a potential space. Though it only contains a small amount of fluid normally, it can sometimes accumulate fluid or air that widens the space. The pericardial space is another potential space that may fill with fluid (effusion) in certain disease states (e.g. pericarditis; a large pericardial effusion may result in cardiac tamponade).

== Examples ==
- Costodiaphragmatic recess
- Pericardial cavity
- Epidural space (within the skull)
- Subdural space
- Peritoneal cavity
- Hepatorenal recess
- Buccal space

== See also ==
- Fascial spaces of the head and neck
