= Dental instrument =

Medical devices and tools used in dentistry

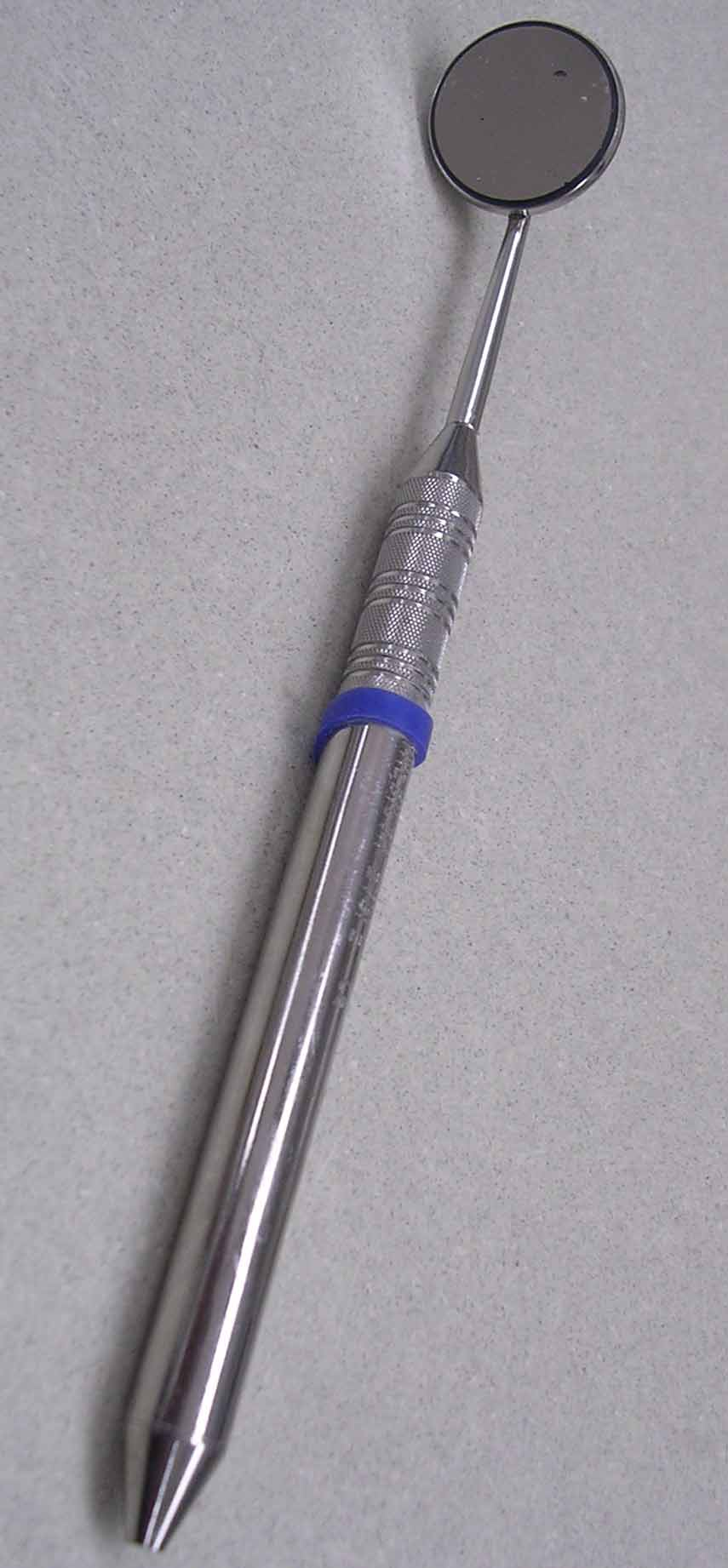
Mouth mirror, a commonly used dental instrument

Dental instruments are medical devices and other tools used by dental professionals to examine, manipulate, treat, restore, and remove teeth and surrounding oral structures. They include examination and diagnostic instruments, hand and rotary cutting instruments, periodontal instruments, restorative instruments, endodontic instruments, and reusable surgical instruments used in dental and oral surgery.

Dental instrumentation has developed alongside dentistry from early tools for manipulating or extracting teeth to increasingly specialized instruments designed for particular diagnostic and therapeutic procedures. Dental instruments are distinguished from devices intended to remain in or on the patient, such as dental implants, dental prostheses, orthodontic appliances, and restorative materials, although instruments are used to place, adjust, or remove such devices.

Reusable dental instruments require decontamination and reprocessing between patients according to their intended use. This can include cleaning, disinfection, inspection, packaging, and sterilization, commonly undertaken as part of sterile processing.

== Examination instruments ==
These tools allow dental professionals to manipulate tissues for better visual access during treatment or during dental examination.

=== Dental mirror ===
The dentist or dental auxiliary use dental mirrors to view a mirror image of the teeth in locations of the mouth where visibility is difficult or impossible. They also are used for reflecting light onto desired surfaces, and for retraction of soft tissues to improve access or vision.

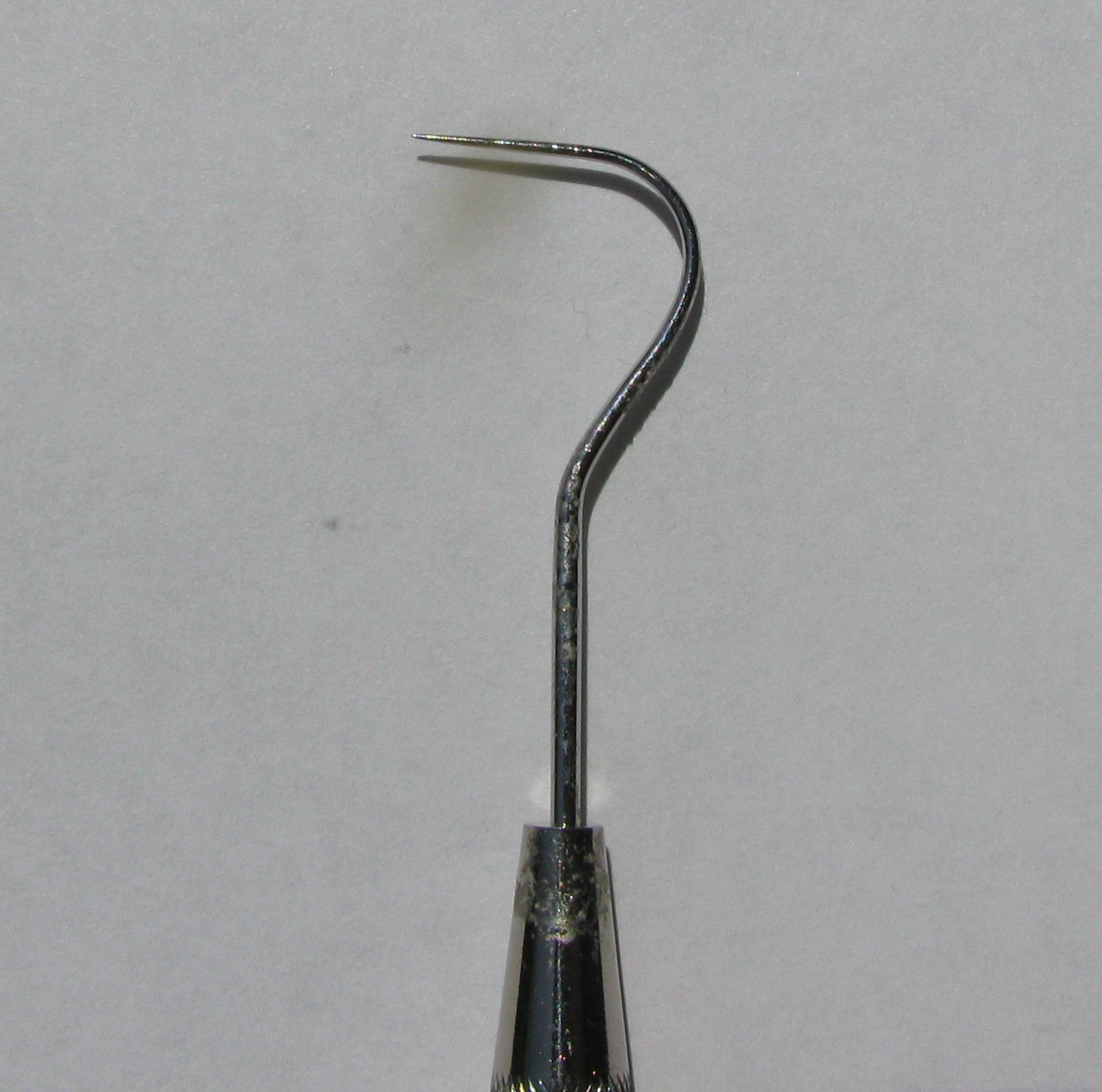
Pig tail dental explorer

=== Probes ===
- Dental explorer (sickle probe)
- Periodontal probe
- Explorer Probe

== Retractors ==
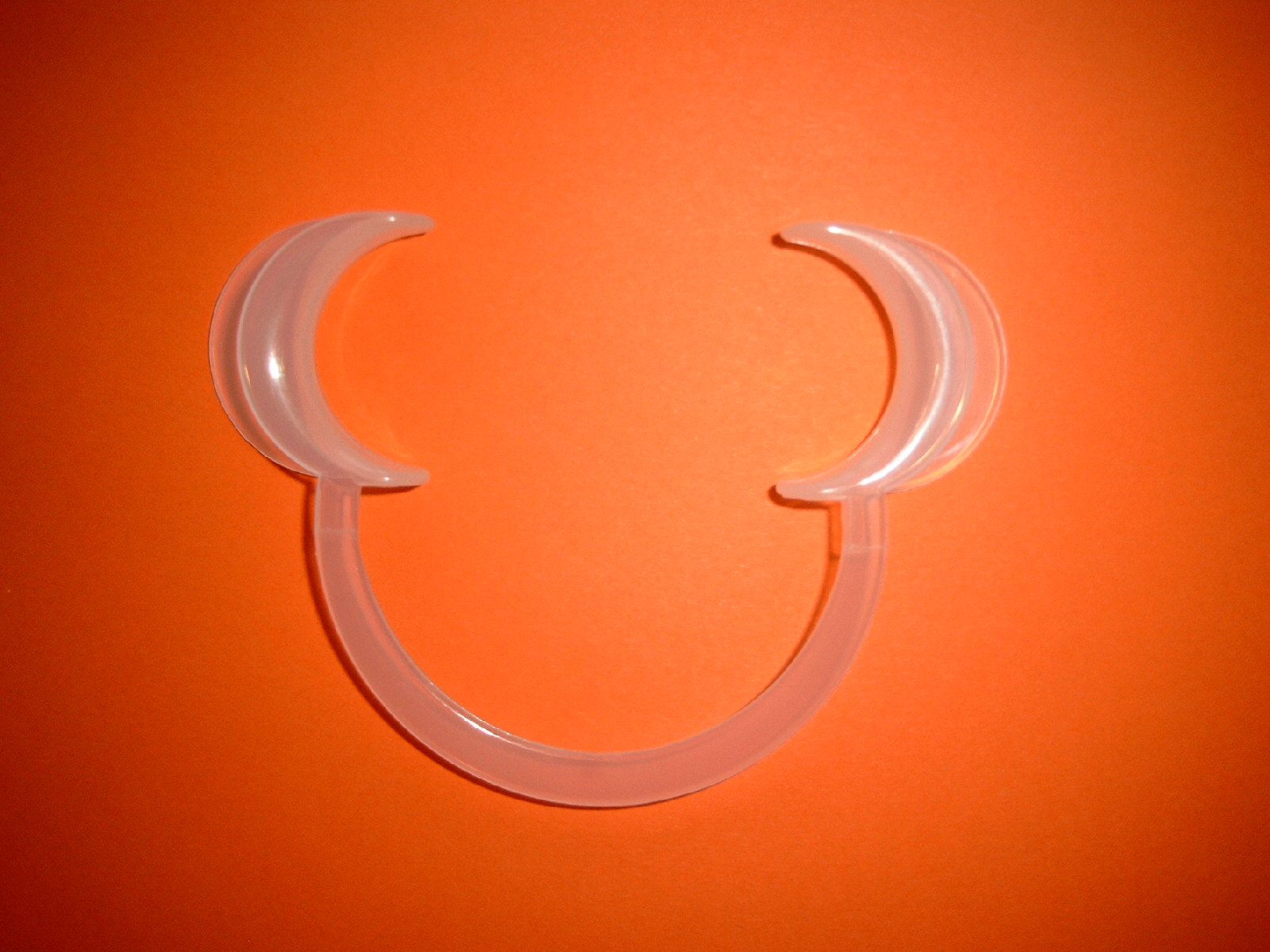
Cheek retractor

- Cheek retractor
- Dental mirror
- Lip retractor
- Mouth prop
- Tongue retractor

== Local anesthesia ==
- Dental anesthesia and dental syringe

Anesthesia is classified into three types: local, regional, and general, each of which affects the nervous system in some way and can be provided via a variety of methods and medications.

Local anaesthesia is a type of anaesthetic medicine that numbs just a small, specific area of the body (it can be administered as a shot, spray, or ointment). (for example, a foot, hand, or patch of skin). A person is awake while being drugged with local anaesthesia. Local anaesthesia has a short duration and is frequently utilised for simple outpatient operations. (when patients come in for surgery and can go home that same day). For someone having outpatient surgery in a clinic or doctor's office (such as the dentist or dermatologist), this anesthetic is likely used. The medicine can numb the area during the procedure and for a short time afterwards to help control post-surgery discomfort.

The function of this instrument involves successfully piercing the surface of the periodontal ligament so the patient can be distributed the anesthesia. Past devices have proven to be insufficient because it instilled fear in patients and made it exhaustingly uncomfortable for dentists to use because of the bulky size. With how simple it is to hide it in the hand due to the smaller size of modern day anesthetic syringes, dentists are successfully able to maneuver in a patient's mouth without causing harm to the patient being treated, allowing for a quick insert of the anesthesia followed by the dentist being able to move on swiftly to the next task of the dental visit. Another aspect of the syringe is the capability of use, which means dentists are able to easily insert fluid in the device and follow the color coded instructions that allow for efficient use of the dental instrument. The device is so intricately sized that doctors are able to grip it well enough to get the job done. Some anesthetic syringes also include a power handle that gives the doctor less of a responsibility over the amount of pressure needed to push in the medicine because the power handle has settings that let the dentist set an amount for how much anesthetic they want to be produced.

== Dental handpieces ==
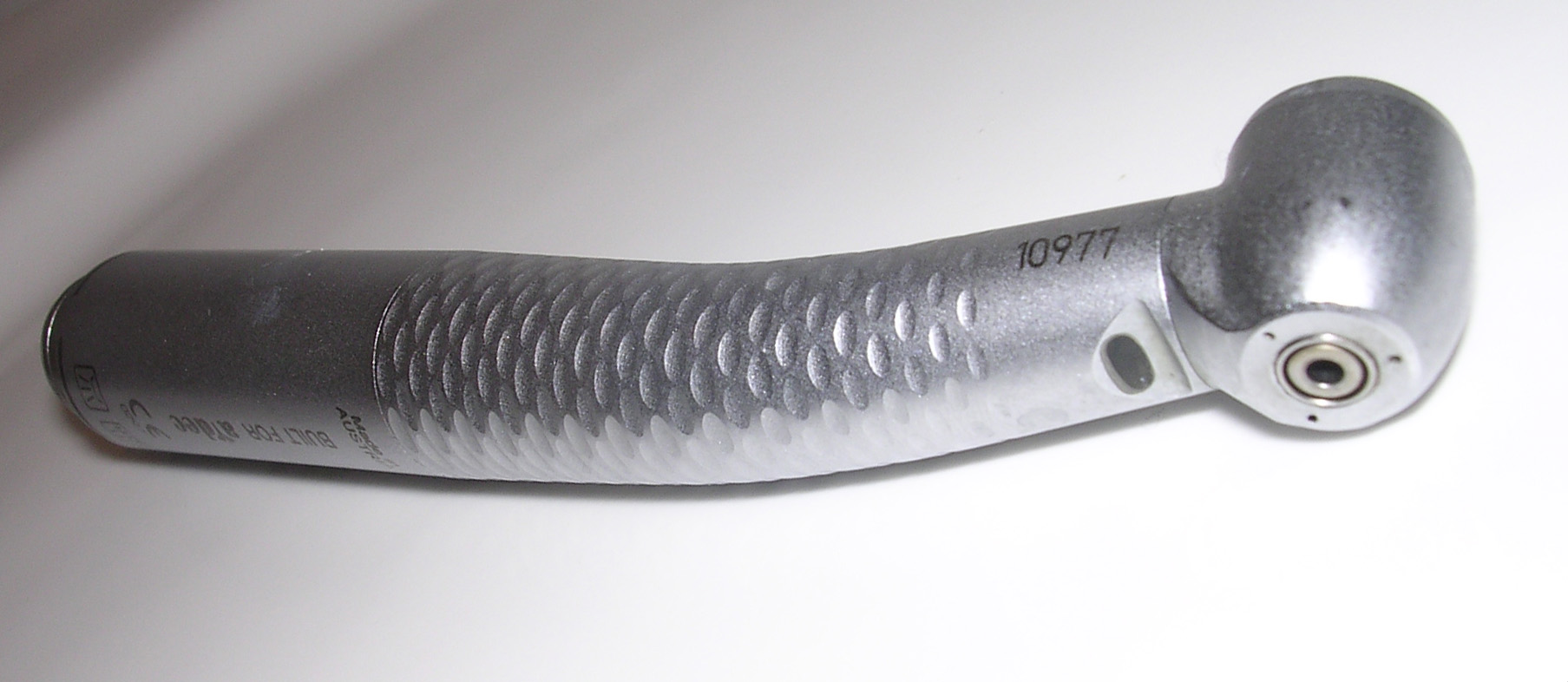
A high-speed dental handpiece

Dental handpieces are classified into several varieties, including high-speed air driven (also known as an airotor), slow-speed (also known as low-speed), friction grip, and high-torque surgical handpieces. These are used with dental burs to cut, shape and polish dental tissues and restorative materials.

Slow-speed handpieces are also used in combination with a disposable brush or rubber cup during prophylactic treatment. Specially-made prophy handpieces contain a screw-in mechanism to secure the threaded attachment.

Straight, slow-speed handpieces are used outside of the mouth with large friction burs to adjust and contour dental appliances, such as removable dentures, orthodontic devices or bite splints.

== Dental laser ==
A dental laser is a type of laser designed specifically for use in oral surgery or dentistry.

The use of a laser can decrease morbidity after surgery, and reduces the need for anesthetics. Because of the cauterization of tissue there will be little bleeding following soft tissue procedures, and some risks of alternative electrosurgery procedures are avoided.

== Dental torque wrench ==
A dental torque wrench or restorative torque wrench is a torque wrench used to precisely apply a specific torque to a fastener screw for fixation of an abutment, dentures, or prosthetics on a dental implant.

== Burs ==
The cutting surfaces of dental burs are made of a multi-fluted tungsten carbide, a diamond-coated tip, or a stainless steel multi-fluted rosehead. There are many types and classifications of burs. Some of the most common are the round bur (sizes ¼ to 10) or inverted cone (sizes 33½ to 90L).

Burs are also classified by:

- The type of material the bur is made of

- The shank type and total length of the bur

- The shape of the head

- The size of the grit

- The maximum diameter of the head

For instance, a latch type, or right angle bur, is only used in the slow-speed handpiece with contra-angle attachment. A long shank or shaft is only used in slow speed when the contra-angle is not in use, and finally, a friction grip bur, which is a small bur, is used only in the high-speed handpiece.

There are many bur shapes that are utilized in various specific procedures.

=== Operative burs ===
Flat fissure, pear-shaped, football, round, tapered, flame, chamfer, bevel, end cut, bud bur, steel, inverted cone, diamond, brown stone, and green-stone

== Restorative instruments ==
=== Excavators ===
- Spoon excavator: Used to remove soft carious decay
- Half hollenbach: Used to test for overhangs or flash
- Dental hatchers: Used to widen the entrance of the tooth cavity and slice away the thin carious enamel
- Chisels:
  - Straight - bevels the cavosurface margin and used in 3, 4, and 5 classifications of cavities on the maxillary
  - Wedelstaedt - only used in the anterior for classes 3, 4, and 5
  - Bin Angle - this is held in a pen grasp and used for class 2 maxillary only

== Burnishers ==
Burnishers are used for polishing and contouring amalgam fillings and to polish composite fillings. They include:

- Ball burnisher
- Beavertail burnisher
- Cone burnisher
- Flat plastic
- Pear shaped burnisher
- Football shaped burnisher

== Pluggers ==
Pluggers are also known as amalgam condensers. They are used to achieve a well-condensed filling by compressing the filling material into the cavity and applying pressure.

- Amalgam plugger
- 49 plugger

== Periodontal instruments ==
=== Fine scalers ===
Fine scalers are used in the removal of soft deposits. They include:

- Drury scalers
- Fine excavators
- MF 4/5

=== Heavy scalers ===
These are seen as the scalers used in the removal for heavy tartar and stains which are not removed by the fine scalers. They include:

- American pattern B
- Cushion scaler
- Excavator
- Hoe scaler
- Jacquette 1
- Jacquette 2
- Jacquette 3
- Scaler 152

=== Curettes ===
Types include:

- Gracey curettes - semicircle tipped, but one edge lower than the other. It is used at 70° to the tooth root surface.
- Universal curettes - these have a semicircular tip used at 90° to the tooth root surface.

== Prosthodontic instruments ==
=== Removable prosthodontics ===
- Articulators
- Blow torch
- Bunsen burner
- Calipers
- Face bow
- Fox plane
- Glass mixing slab
- Lecrons carver
- Mixing bowls
- Spatulas for mixing dental plaster
- Spatulas for mixing impression materials
- Wax carver
- Wax knife
- Wax spatula
- Willis gauge

== Extraction and surgical instruments ==
=== Dental forceps ===
Ancient Greek and Roman dentists extracted teeth with lead pliers. In 1840, Sir John Tomes and his friend Evrard made the first pair of dental forceps. In 1841, Tomes posted an article to tell the whole world about his discovery of new forceps that had never been seen before, successfully becoming the creator of the forceps and the concept of forceps. In earlier times, or during the eighteenth and nineteenth centuries, elevators and pelicans were used as extraction devices because the idea of dental forceps did not exist, but the thought of extracting in the first place with some form of a tool was there. With pelicans, their sharp talons were used to be placed down on the inside of the mouth near the gums while the elevator helped pull the tooth out of its socket. Then, a pair of pincers would do the rest of the job, wiggling the tooth out of the gum until the extraction was complete. The functionality of today's dental forceps come from the need to remove items from the mouth such as the cotton balls dentists place next to a patient's teeth or the rubber bands a patient needs for their braces. However, most dental forceps are not designed for comfort, nor do they take the account of the dental practitioners hand positions throughout the procedure to mind. Dental forceps have been designed to the point where dentists experience medical complications of their own on the carpal scale considering their hands are always placed in an awkward angle while they remove items from the patient's mouth.

==== List of dental forceps ====
- Bayonet
- Cow horns #23
- Greyhound
- Lower universals
- Root
- Upper canine
- Upper left molar
- Upper right molar
- Upper straight long
- Upper straight short
- Upper universal fine
- Upper universals
- Upper wisdom tooth

=== Elevators ===
- Cogswell-A & B elevators
- Coupland's elevators
- Crane root tip elevators
- Crossbar apex luxators
- Cryer elevators
- Flat elevators
- Heidbrink root tip elevators
- Miller's apex luxators
- Molts elevators
- Narrow and wide, straight and curved luxators
- Periosteal elevators
- Potts elevators
- Root-tip pick elevator
- Warwick James elevators
- Winter elevators

=== Chisels ===
- Osteotome

== Orthodontic instruments ==
- Band pusher
- Band setter
- Bird beak pliers
- Bracket holder
- Bracket tweezer
- Cinch back
- Distal end cutters
- Elastics
- Hemostat/Mathieu pliers
- Tucker
- Matrix band
- (Tofflemire) Matrix retainer
- Spring ring

== Endodontic instruments ==
- Apex locator
- Endodontic explorer
- Finger pluggers
- Finger spreader
- Gates glidden burs
- Guttapercha retrieval files
- Endodontic files and reamers
  - Broken instrument retrieval files
  - Controlled memory flexible files
  - Hedstrom or H-files
  - K-files
  - Manual tapered files
  - McSpadden files
  - NiTi flex files
  - Pathfinder files
  - Rotary tapered files
- Lentulo spiral
- Masserans kit
- Microscope
- Peeso reamer burs
- Post and core kit

== See also ==
- Dentist
  - Dental auxiliary
- Dentistry
