= Dental extraction =

Operation to remove a tooth

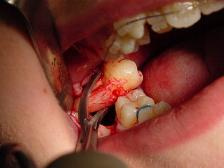
- Surgical extraction of an impacted molar
- Specialty: Oral and maxillofacial surgery, periodontics
- ICD-9-CM: 23.0–23.1
- MeSH: D014081

A dental extraction (also referred to as tooth extraction, exodontia, exodontics, or informally, tooth pulling) is the removal of teeth from the dental alveolus (socket) in the alveolar bone. Extractions are performed for a wide variety of reasons, but most commonly to remove teeth which have become unrestorable through tooth decay, periodontal disease, or dental trauma, especially when they are associated with toothache. Sometimes impacted wisdom teeth (wisdom teeth that are stuck and unable to grow normally into the mouth) cause recurrent infections of the gum (pericoronitis), and may be removed when other conservative treatments have failed (cleaning, antibiotics and operculectomy). In orthodontics, if the teeth are crowded, healthy teeth may be extracted (often bicuspids) to create space so the rest of the teeth can be straightened.

== Procedure ==
Extractions could be categorized into non-surgical (simple) and surgical, depending on the type of tooth to be removed and other factors.

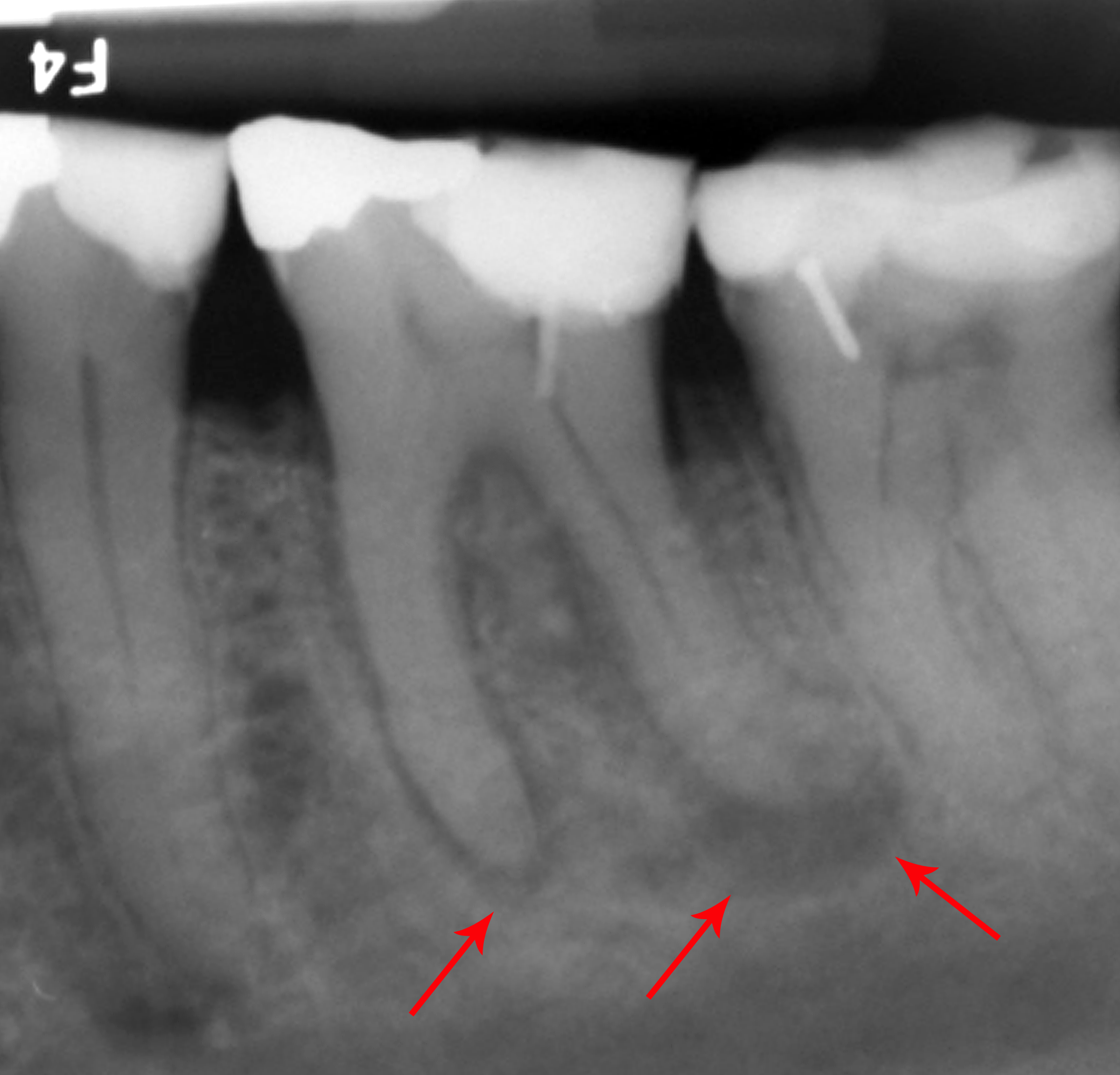
A dental x-ray image (radiograph) showing the shape and number of roots of the molars which cannot be observed in the mouth directly.

=== Assessment and special investigations ===
A comprehensive history taking should be performed to find out the pain history of the tooth, the patient's medical history and the history of previous difficult extractions. The tooth should be assessed clinically i.e. checked visually by the dentist. Pre-extraction radiographs are not always necessary but are often taken to confirm the diagnosis and hence appropriate treatment plan. Radiographs also help in visualising the shape and size of roots which are beneficial in planning the extraction. All this information will aid the dentist in foreseeing any difficulties and hence preparing appropriately.

=== Obtaining consent from patient ===
In order to obtain permission from patient for extraction of tooth, the dentist should explain that other treatment options are available, what is involved in the dental extraction procedure, the potential risks of the procedure and the benefits of the procedure. The process of gaining consent should be documented in clinical notes.

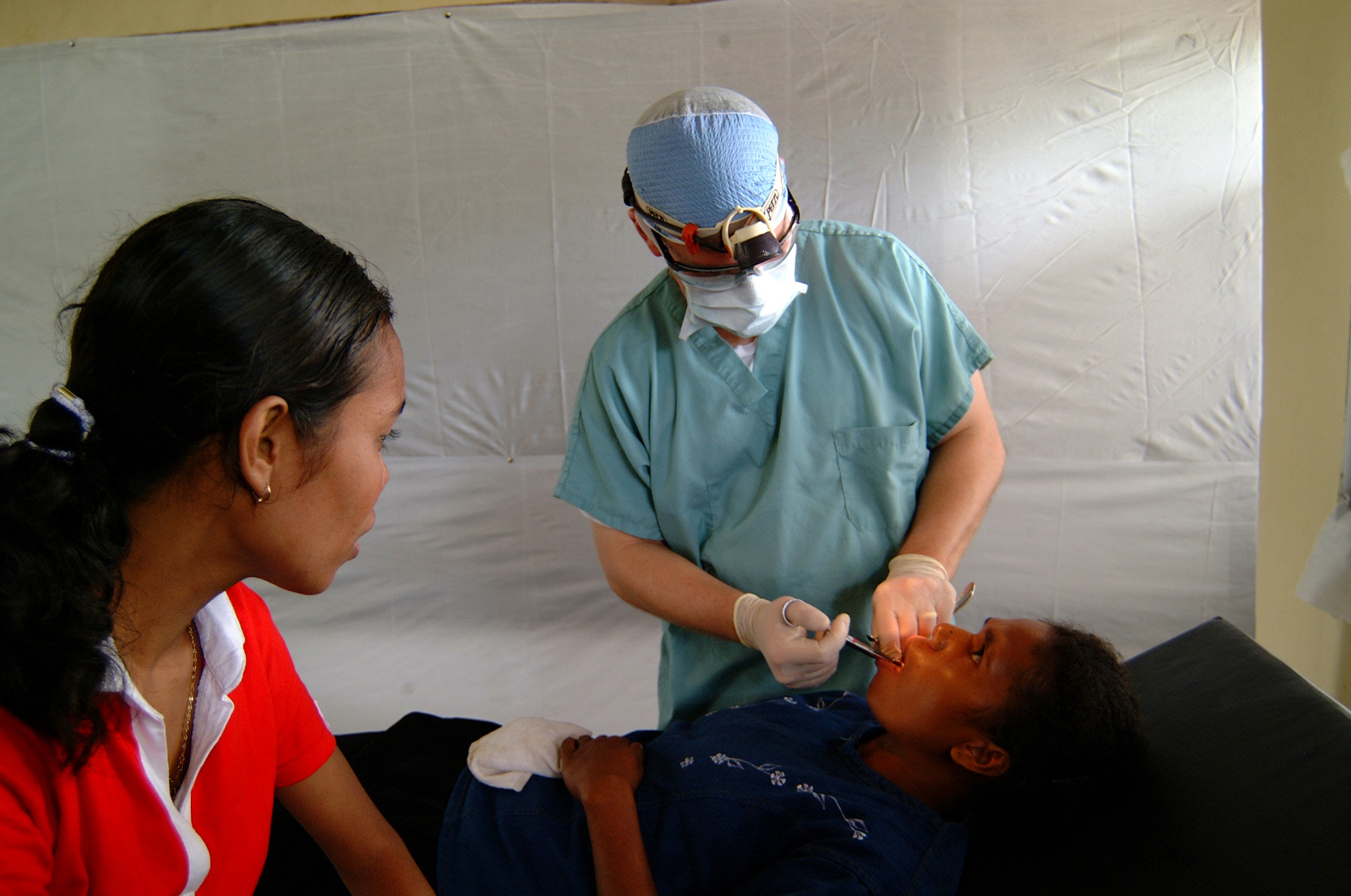
Mark Roback, a US Navy dentist from the Military Sealift Command (MSC) hospital ship USNS Mercy (T-AH-19), speaking to his patient through an interpreter, informs her about the injection he is giving.

=== Giving local anaesthetic ===
Before extracting a tooth, the dentist would deliver local anaesthetic to ensure the tooth and surrounding tissues are numb before they start the extraction. There are several techniques to achieve numbness of the tooth including

- infiltration – injection containing local anaesthetic is delivered into the gum near the root tip of the tooth to be extracted. This allows the local anaesthetic to penetrate through the bone, eventually reaching the nerve bundle of the tooth to be extracted.
- nerve block – injection containing local anaesthetic is delivered to an earlier branch of a nerve. For example, the inferior alveolar nerve block can be used to anaesthetise all the lower teeth.

The two most commonly used local anaesthetics in the UK are lidocaine and articaine. Prior to injection, topical anaesthetic gel or cream, such as lidocaine or benzocaine, can be applied to the gum to numb the site of the injection up to a few millimetres deep. This should reduce the discomfort felt during the injection and thus help to reduce patient anxiety.

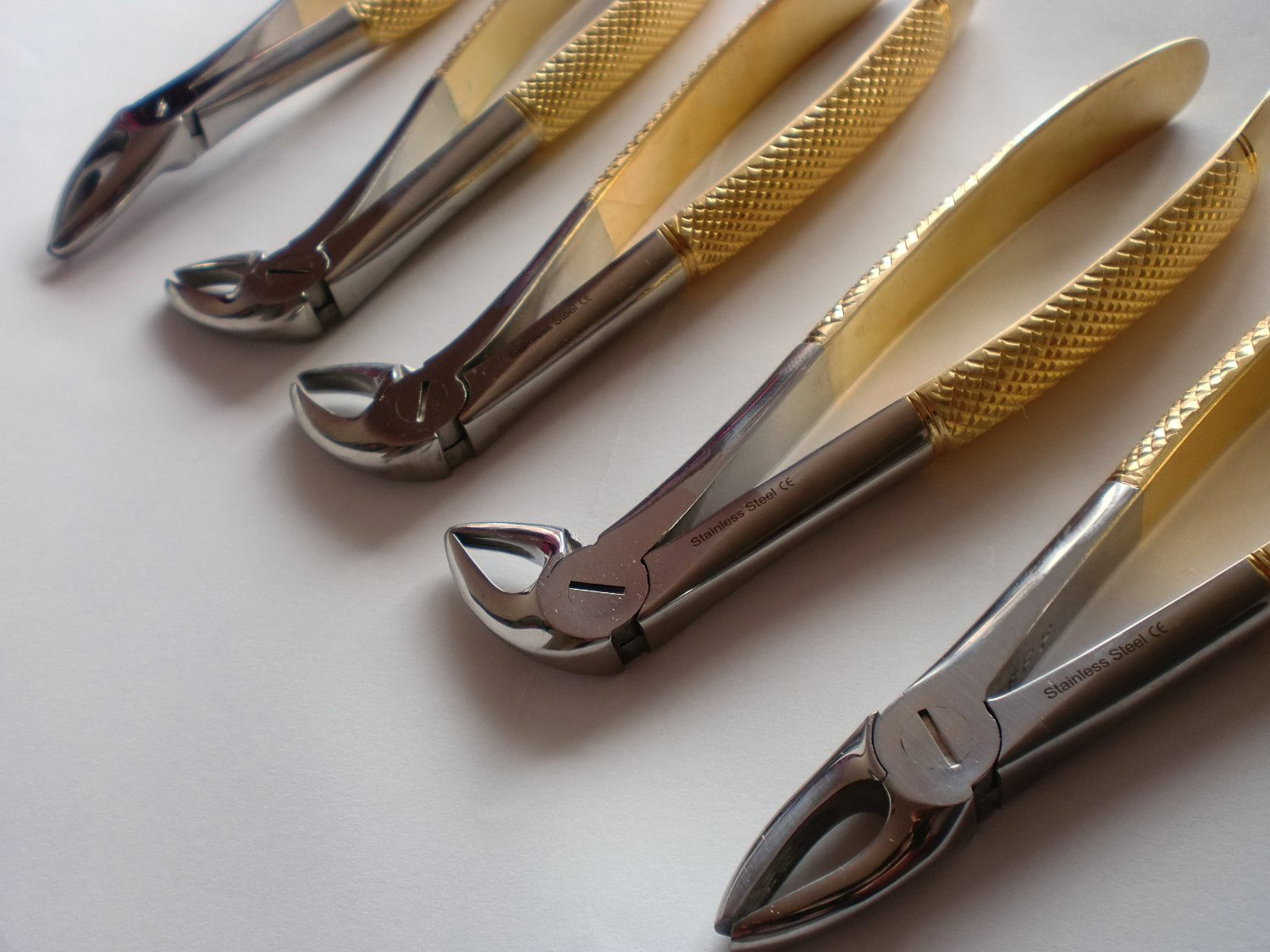
Dental extraction forceps

=== Removal of tooth ===
During extraction, multiple instruments are used to aid and ease the removal of the tooth whilst trying to minimally traumatise the tissues to allow for quicker healing. Extraction forceps are commonly used to remove teeth. Different shaped forceps are available depending on the type of tooth requiring removal, what side of the mouth (left or right) it is on and if it is an upper or lower tooth. The beaks of the forceps must grip onto the root of the tooth securely before pressure is applied along the long axis of the tooth towards the root.

Different movements of the forceps can be employed to remove teeth. Generally, while keeping downwards pressure attempts to move the tooth towards the cheek side (buccal) and then the opposite direction (palatal or lingual) are made to loosen the tooth from its socket. For single, conical-rooted teeth such as the incisors, rotatory movements are also used. A 'figure of eight' movement can be used to extract lower molars.

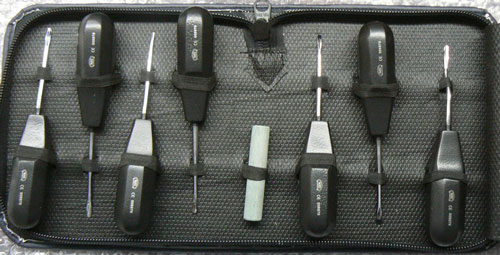
Dental luxators.

Instruments used are summarised below:

Name	Type of instrument	Use	Area of use	Unique features
Luxator	Luxator	Tear PDL around tooth	Anywhere	Sharp blade
Coupland	Elevator	expand socket and lift	Anywhere	Numbered 1–3 from most narrow to wide
Warrick James	Elevator	Expand socket and lift tooth	Anywhere	Right left and straight
Cryers	Elevator	Expand socket and lift tooth	Anywhere	Right and left with sharp tips
Upper straight	Forceps	Remove teeth	Upper canine to canine	Straight handle
Upper anterior	Forceps	Remove teeth	Upper anteriors and premolars	
Upper molar	Forceps	Remove teeth	Upper 1st/2nd/3rd molars	One pointed end to engage buccal furcation
Upper bayonet	Forceps	Remove teeth	Upper 3rd molars	Curved handle and tip to reach 3rd molars
Upper root	Forceps	Remove teeth	Upper retained/fractured roots	Narrow tips
Cowhorn	Forceps	Remove teeth	Lower molars	Thin tips to engage furcation of broken down molars
Lower anterior	Forceps	Remove teeth	Lower anteriors and premolars	90 degree bend handle
lower molar	Forceps	Remove teeth	Lower 1st/2nd/3rd molars	2 beak tips to engage furcations
Lower root	Forceps	Remove teeth	Lower retained/fractured roots	Narrow tips to engage roots

In terms of operator positioning when removing a tooth, the patient is placed more supine when extracting an upper and more upright when extracting a lower. This is to allow direct vision for the operator during the procedure. A right handed operator will stand to the front of the patient and to their right when removing any upper teeth or lower left teeth. However, they will stand behind the patient and to the right when extracting a lower right tooth.

Dental elevators can be used to aid removal of teeth. Various types are available that have different shapes. Their working ends are designed to engage into the space between the tooth and bone of the socket. Rotatory movements are then made to dislodge the tooth from the socket. Another similar looking but sharper instrument that can be used is a luxator; this instrument can be used gently and with great care to cut the ligament between the tooth and its boney socket (periodontal ligament).

=== Achieving haemostasis ===
Biting down on a piece of sterile gauze over the socket will provide firm pressure to the wound. Normally this is sufficient to stop any bleeding and will promote blood clot formation at the base of the socket.

Moreover, the patient must be inhibited from eating and drinking hot food in the first 24 hours. Using straw for drinking is also prohibited due to the negative pressure it can produce which will lead to removal of a newly formed clot from the socket.

The source of any bleeding can either be from soft tissues (gingiva and mucosa) or hard tissue (the bony socket). Bleeding of soft tissues can be controlled by several means including suturing the wound (stitches) and/ or using chemical agents such as tranexamic acid, ferric sulphate and silver nitrate. Bony bleeding can be arrested by using haemostatic gauze and bone wax. Other means of achieving haemostasis include electrocautery.

== Reasons ==
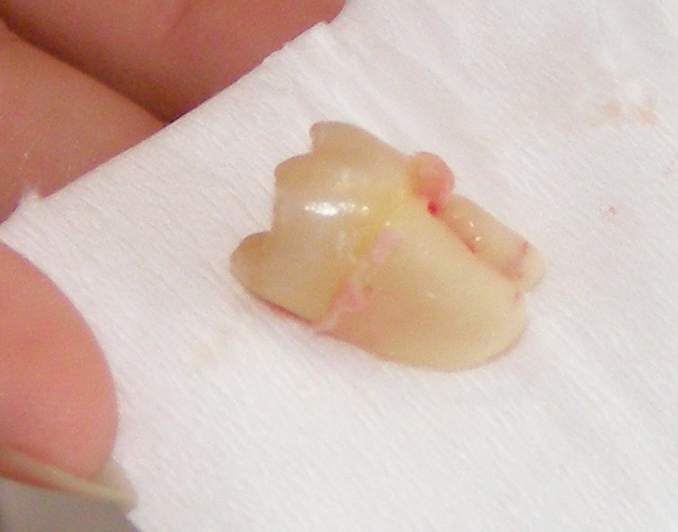
Extracted wisdom tooth that was horizontally impacted

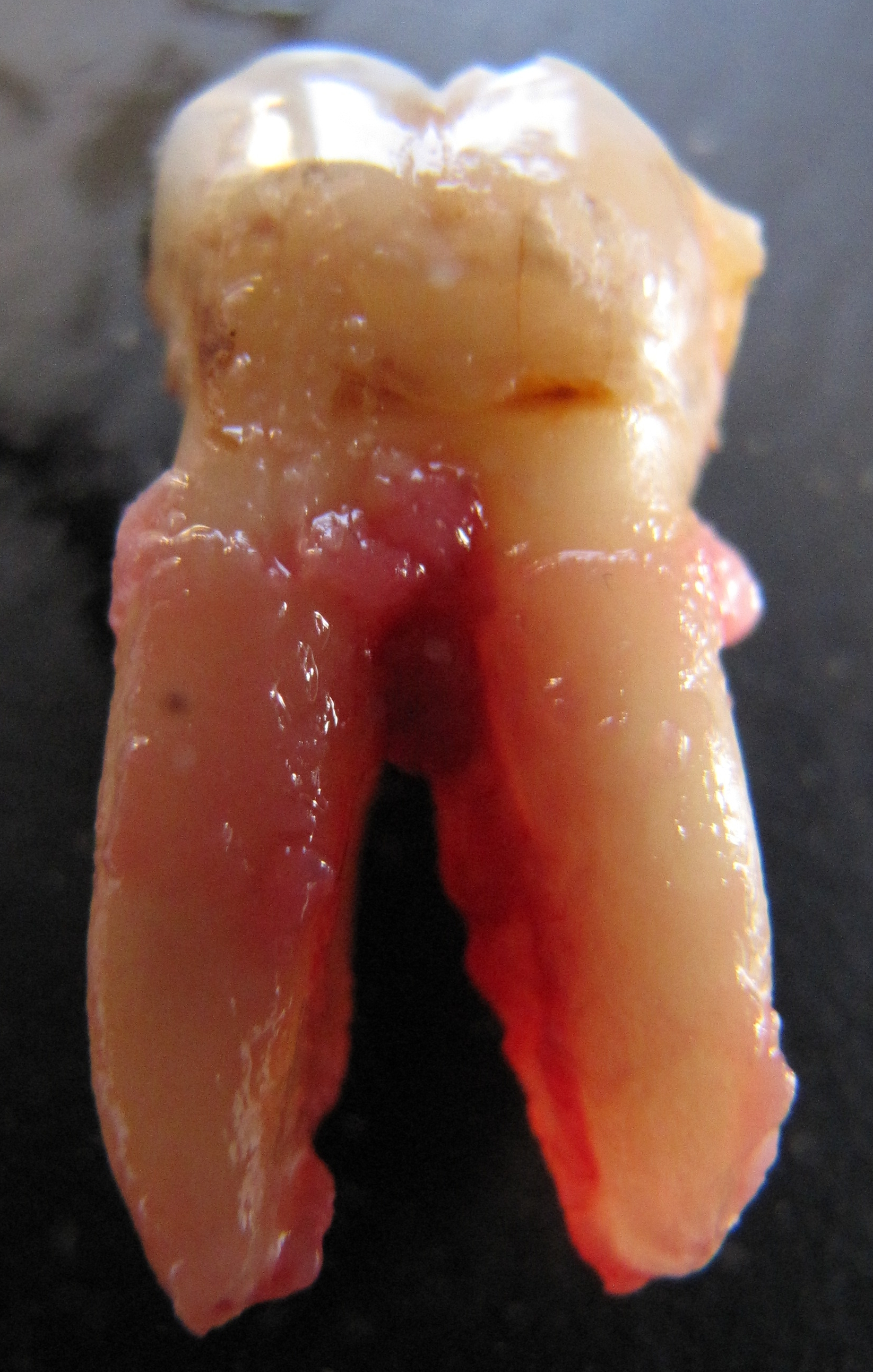
Extracted tooth

Medical/Dental

- Severe tooth decay or infection (acute or chronic alveolar abscess, such as periapical abscess – collection of infected material [pus] forming at the tip of the root of a tooth). Despite the reduction in worldwide prevalence of dental caries, it is still the most common reason for extraction of (non-third molar) teeth, accounting for up to two thirds of extractions.
- Severe gum disease, which may affect the supporting tissues and bone structures of teeth.
- Treatment of symptomatic impacted wisdom teeth e.g. that are associated with pericoronitis, unrestorable caries or cysts.
- Prophylactic removal of asymptomatic impacted wisdom teeth. Historically, many asymptomatic impacted third molars were removed, however, both American and British Health Authorities now provide guidance about the indication for third molar removal. The American Public Health Association, for example, adopted a policy, Opposition to Prophylactic Removal of Third Molars (Wisdom Teeth), because of the large number of injuries resulting from unnecessary extractions.
- Supernumerary teeth that are blocking other teeth from coming in.
- Supplementary or malformed teeth.
- Fractured teeth.
- Teeth in the fracture line of the jaw bone
- Teeth which cannot be restored endodontically.
- Prosthetics; teeth detrimental to the fit or appearance of dentures.
- Head and neck radiation therapy, to treat and/or manage tumors, may require extraction of teeth, either before or after radiation treatments.
- Lower cost, compared to other treatments.
- Medically unnecessary extraction as a form of physical torture.
- It was once a common practice to remove the front teeth of institutionalized psychiatric patients who had a history of biting.

Orthodontic

- In preparation for orthodontic treatment (braces). Extractions are commonly required before the provision of orthodontic treatment, to create space for crowded teeth to be moved into. The premolar teeth are the most commonly extracted teeth for this purpose.

Aesthetics

- Cosmetic: to remove teeth of poor appearance, unsuitable for restoration.

== Types ==
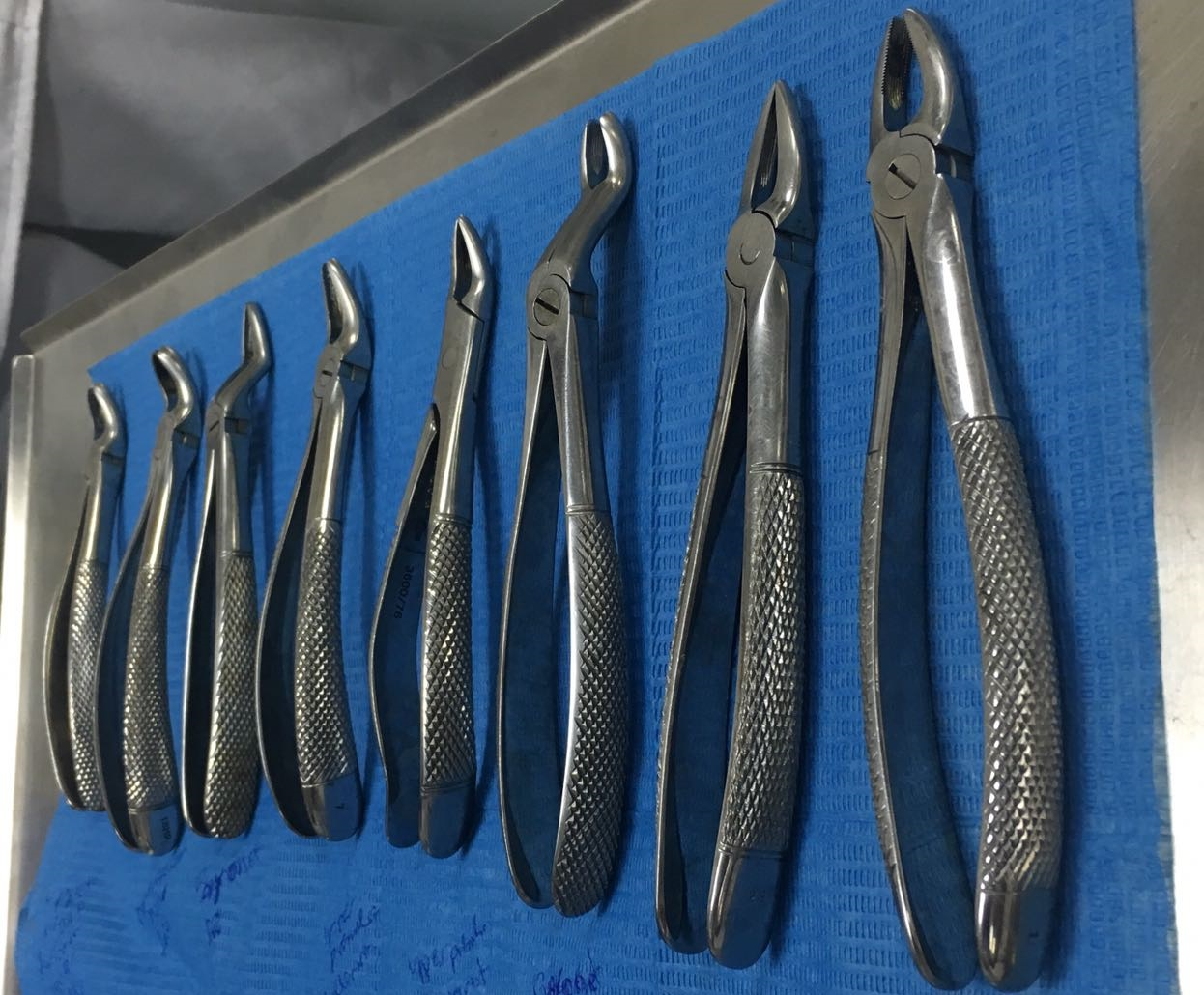
Dental extraction forceps commonly used on teeth in the maxillary arch

Extractions are often categorized as "simple" or "surgical".

Simple extractions are performed on teeth that are visible in the mouth, usually with the patient under local anaesthetic, and require only the use of instruments to elevate and/or grasp the visible portion of the tooth. Typically the tooth is lifted using an elevator, and using dental forceps, specific tooth movements are performed (e.g. rocking the tooth back and forth) expanding the tooth socket. Once the periodontal ligament is broken and the supporting alveolar bone has been adequately widened the tooth can be removed. Typically, when teeth are removed with forceps, slow, steady pressure is applied with controlled force.

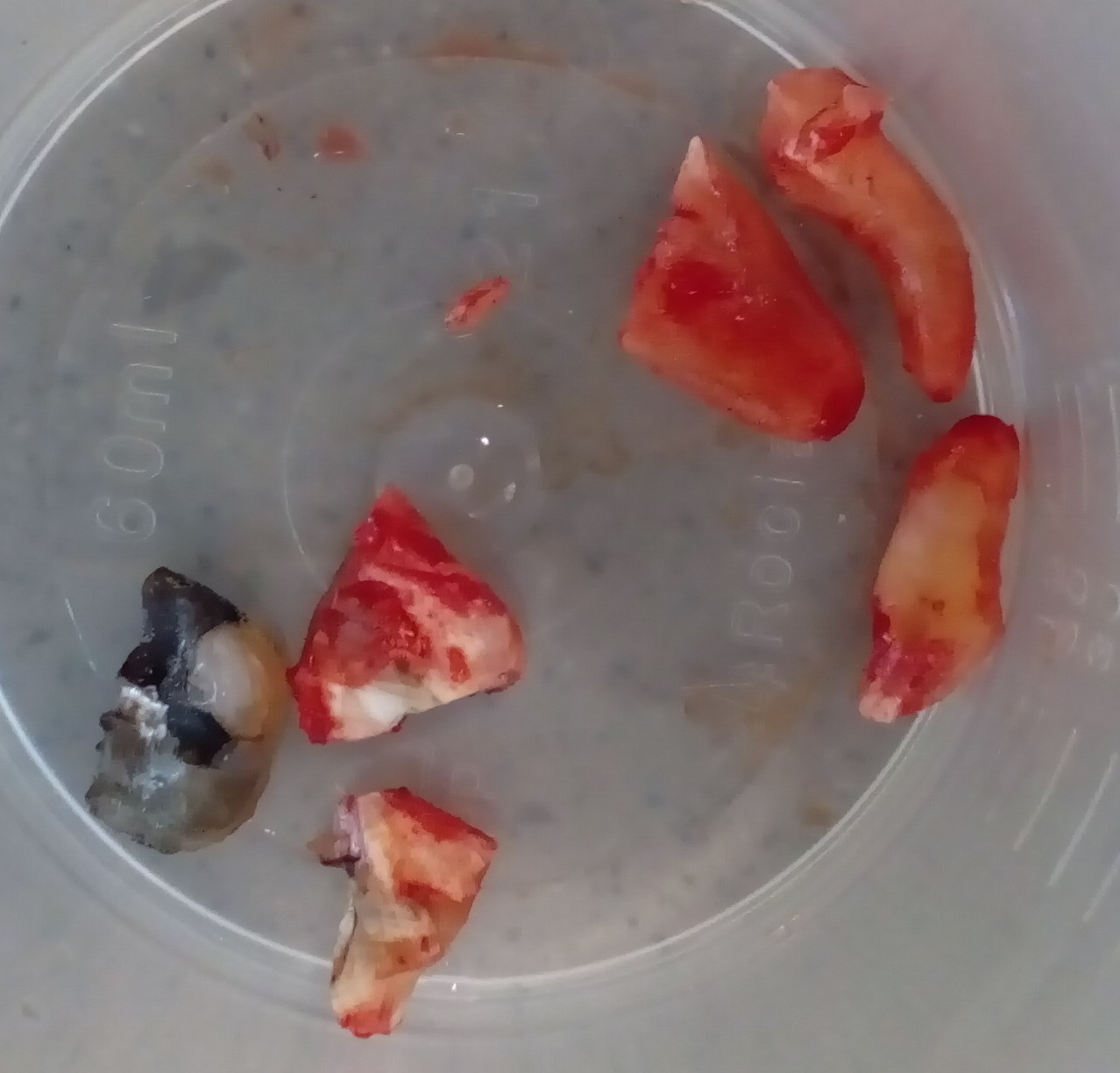
Molar cut up during surgical extraction – the curvature of the three roots (top right) prevented simple extraction

Surgical extractions involve the removal of teeth that cannot be easily accessed or removed via simple extraction, for example because they have broken under the gum or because they have not erupted fully, such as an impacted wisdom tooth. Surgical extractions almost always require an incision. In a surgical extraction the dentist may elevate the soft tissues covering the tooth and bone, and may also remove some of the overlying and/or surrounding jaw bone with a drill or, less commonly, an instrument called an osteotome. Frequently, the tooth may be split into multiple pieces to facilitate its removal.

Common risks after any extraction include pain, swelling, bleeding, bruising, infection, trismus (not being able to open as wide as normal) and dry socket. There are additional risks associated with the surgical extraction of wisdom teeth in particular: permanent or temporary damage to the inferior alveolar nerve +/− lingual nerve, causing permanent or temporary numbness, tingling or altered sensation to the lip, chin +/− tongue.

=== Surgical procedure ===
1. Incisions are made full thickness through mucosa and periosteum to bone. In general, the flap is extended from one tooth behind the tooth concerned to one tooth in front, including the interdental papilla.
2. An anterior relieving incision is made extending down into the sulcus. This flap design is called "two sided". A "three sided" flap includes an additional relieving incision posteriorly.
3. The flap is raised using periosteal elevator to expose the area of interest.
4. The flap is held out of the way with an instrument such as a rake retractor.
5. A small gutter of bone is drilled away around the tooth to make space into which an application point for instruments can be achieved. It is important that copious amount of saline is used to cool the bone during this process.
6. The tooth concerned can be removed using a combination of luxators, elevators and extraction forceps.
7. Any sharp bone is smoothed off and the wound is irrigated with saline.
8. The flap is repositioned and sutured in place.

== Pre-extraction consideration ==
=== Anticoagulant/Antiplatelet Use ===
Anticoagulants are drugs that interfere with the clotting cascade. Antiplatelets are drugs that interfere with platelet aggregation. These drugs are prescribed in certain medical conditions/situations to reduce the risk of a thromboembolic event. With this comes an increased risk of bleeding. Historically, the anticoagulant warfarin (belonging to the group of drugs called coumarins) and antiplatelets such as aspirin or clopidogrel, were prescribed commonly in these circumstances. However, whilst these drugs are still used, newer antiplatelet (e.g. ticagrelor) and anticoagulant (e.g. rivaroxaban, apixaban and dabigatran) drugs are being used more commonly. When considering dental treatment (including dental extractions) different guidance/precautions need to be followed depending on the drug prescribed and the individual patient circumstances. The Scottish Dental Clinical Effectiveness Programme (SDCEP) provides excellent guidance on this topic.

=== Antibiotic Prescribing ===
Individual patient circumstances should be evaluated prior to the use of antibiotics to reduce the risks of certain post-extraction complications. There is evidence that use of antibiotics before and/or after impacted wisdom tooth extraction reduces the risk of infections by 66%, and lowers incidence of dry socket by one third. For every 19 people who are treated with an antibiotic following impacted wisdom tooth removal, one infection is prevented. Use of antibiotics does not seem to have a direct effect on manifestation of fever, swelling, or trismus seven days post-extraction. In the 2021 Cochrane review, 23 randomized control double-blinded experiments were reviewed and, after considering the biased risk associated with these studies, it was concluded that there is moderate overall evidence supporting the routine use of antibiotics in practice in order to reduce risk of infection following a third molar extraction. There are still reasonable concerns remaining regarding the possible adverse effects of indiscriminate antibiotic use in patients. There are also concerns about development of antibiotic resistance which advises against the use of prophylactic antibiotics in practice.

=== Assessing risk of nerve damage ===
The inferior alveolar nerve (IAN), a branch of the trigeminal nerve (cranial nerve V), is a nerve that runs through the mandible (lower jaw) and supplies sensation to all the lower teeth, the lip and the chin. The lower teeth, and in particular the lower wisdom teeth, can therefore be in close proximity to this nerve. Damage to the inferior alveolar nerve is a risk of lower wisdom tooth removal (and other surgical procedures in the mandible). This means there is a risk of temporary or permanent numbness or altered sensation to the lip +/− chin on the side the surgery is taking place. Therefore, in order to assess this risk and inform the patient, the position of the inferior alveolar nerve in relation to a lower wisdom tooth needs to be assessed radiographically prior to extraction.

The proximity of the root to the canal can be assessed radiographically and there are several factors which can indicate high risk of nerve damage:

- Darkening of the tooth root where it crosses the canal
- Deviation of the canal
- Narrowing of the roots
- Loss of the lamina dura of the canal
- Juxta apical area: a radiolucency associated with the root of the tooth which is not caused by periapical infection

The lingual nerve can also be damaged (temporary or permanent) during surgical procedures in the mandible, in particular lower wisdom tooth removal. This would present as temporary or permanent numbness/altered sensation/altered taste to the side of tongue (side corresponding to side of surgery).

== Post-extraction healing ==
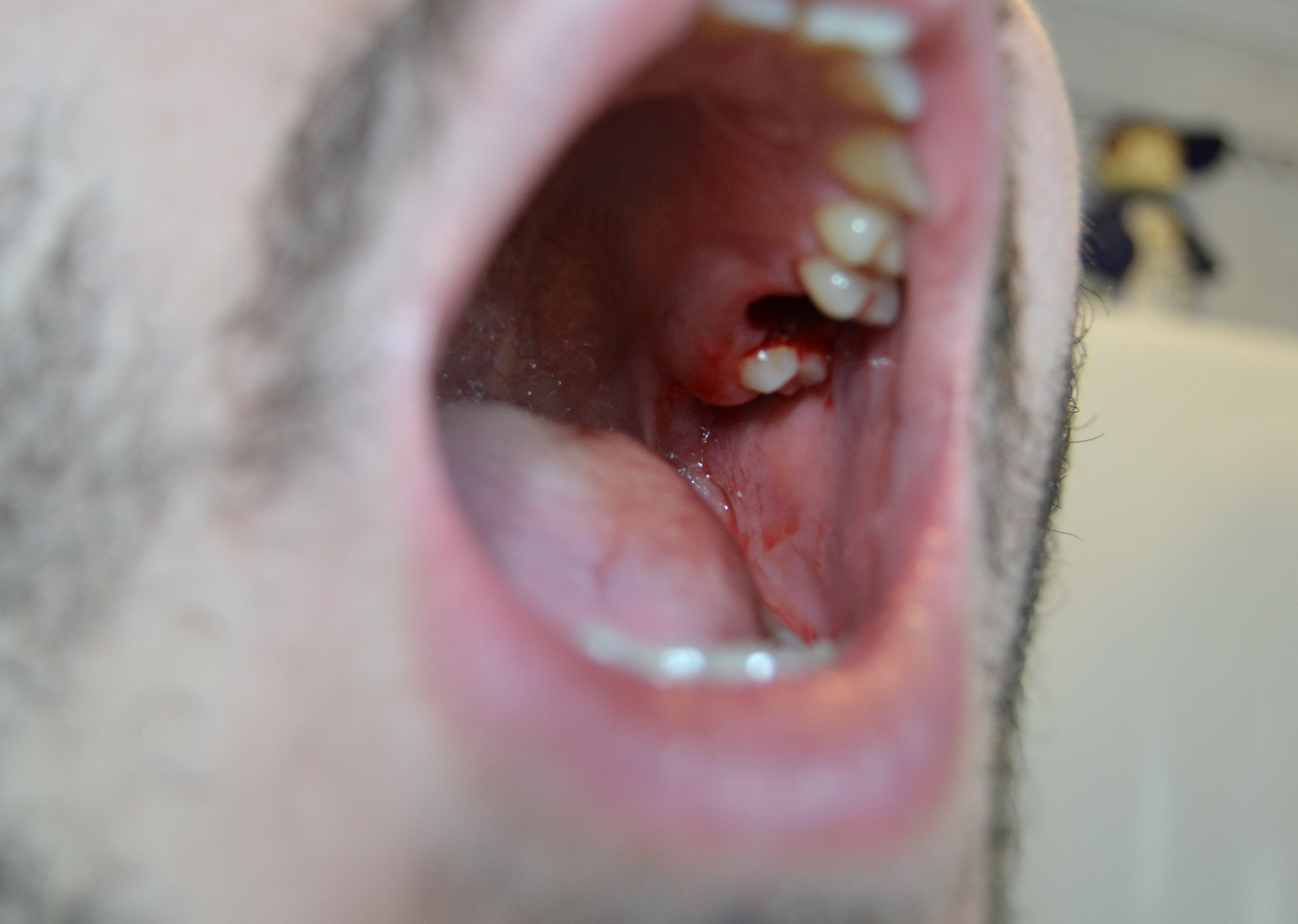
Exodontia of first molar, one hour later

=== Immediate management ===
Immediately following the removal of a tooth, bleeding or oozing very commonly occurs. Pressure is applied by the patient biting on a gauze swab, and a thrombus (blood clot) forms in the socket (hemostatic response). Common hemostatic measures include local pressure application with gauze, and the use of oxidized cellulose (gelfoam) and fibrin sealant. Dental practitioners usually have absorbent gauze, hemostatic packing material (oxidized cellulose, collagen sponge), and suture kit available. Sometimes 30 minutes of continuous pressure is required to fully arrest bleeding.

=== Complications ===
Talking, which moves the mandible and hence removes the pressure applied on the socket, instead of keeping constant pressure, is a very common reason that bleeding might not stop. This is likened to someone with a bleeding wound on their arm, when being instructed to apply pressure, instead holds the wound intermittently every few moments.

Coagulopathies (clotting disorders, e.g. hemophilia) are sometimes discovered for the first time if a person has had no other surgical procedure in their life, but this is rare. Sometimes the blood clot can be dislodged, triggering more bleeding and formation of a new blood clot, or leading to a dry socket (see complications). Some oral surgeons routinely scrape the walls of a socket to encourage bleeding in the belief that this will reduce the chance of dry socket, but there is no evidence that this practice works.

The most serious post extraction healing complication is that slow or halted healing caused by the adverse effects of use of bisphosphonates which can cause osteochemonecrosis of the bone.

=== Healing process ===
The chance of further bleeding reduces as healing progresses, and is unlikely after 24 hours. The blood clot is covered by epithelial cells which proliferate from the gingival mucosa of socket margins, taking about 10 days to fully cover the defect. In the clot, neutrophils and macrophages are involved as an inflammatory response takes place. The proliferative and synthesizing phase next occurs, characterized by proliferation of osteogenic cells from the adjacent bone marrow in the alveolar bone. Bone formation starts after about 10 days from when the tooth was extracted. After 10–12 weeks, the outline of the socket is no longer apparent on an X-ray image. Bone remodeling as the alveolus adapts to the edentulous state occurs in the longer term as the alveolar process slowly resorbs. In maxillary posterior teeth, the degree of pneumatization of the maxillary sinus may also increase as the antral floor remodels.

== Post-extraction management ==
=== Post-operative instructions ===
Post-operative instructions following tooth extractions can be provided to encourage healing of the socket and prevent post-operative complications from arising. The advice listed below is usually given verbally, and can be supplemented with instructions in the written form. The combination of both methods of delivery has been found to reduce the severity of pain experienced by patients post-extraction and results in higher levels of patient satisfaction compared to verbal post-operative instructions alone.

=== General advice ===
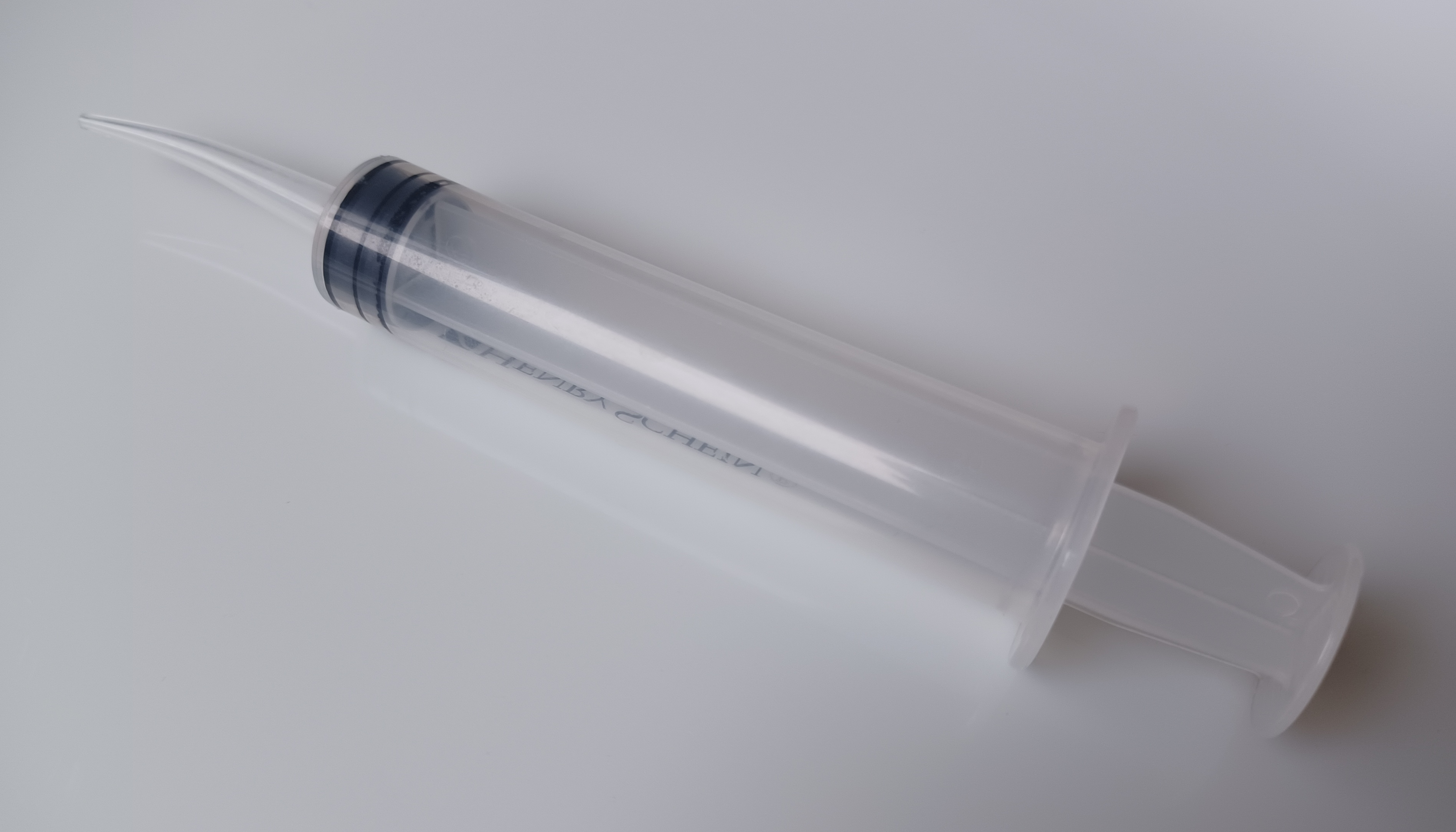
Syringe with a curved tip for cleaning socket

The following can be recommended to encourage healing after a tooth extraction.

- Avoid exploration of the tooth socket with the tongue, a finger or toothbrush – otherwise this might disturb clot formation
- Avoid rinsing mouth for 24 hours to prevent dislodging the blood clot. After 24 hours has passed use warm salty mouthwashes especially after meals to keep the wound clean. Patients may be advised to use a plastic syringe with a curved tip to clean the sockets during the healing process, though evidence for the effectiveness of this practice is limited.
- Avoid alcohol for at least 24 hours
- Try to relax for the remainder of the day, avoiding strenuous activities that will cause an increase in blood pressure as this might disrupt clot formation
- For a few days, adopt a diet consisting of soft foods

=== Pain management ===
Many drug therapies are available for pain management after third molar extractions including NSAIDS (non-steroidal anti-inflammatory), APAP (acetaminophen), and opioid formulations. Although each has its own pain-relieving efficacy, they also pose adverse effects. According to two doctors, Ibuprofen-APAP combinations have the greatest efficacy in pain relief and reducing inflammation along with the fewest adverse effects. Taking either of these agents alone or in combination may be contraindicated in those who have certain medical conditions. For example, taking ibuprofen or any NSAID in conjunction with warfarin (a blood thinner) may not be appropriate. Also, prolonged use of ibuprofen or APAP has gastrointestinal and cardiovascular risks. There is high quality evidence that ibuprofen is superior to paracetamol in managing postoperative pain.

=== Socket preservation ===
Socket preservation or alveolar ridge preservation (ARP) is a procedure to reduce bone loss after tooth extraction to preserve the dental alveolus (tooth socket) in the alveolar bone. At the time of extraction a platelet rich fibrin (PRF) membrane containing bone growth enhancing elements is placed in the wound or a graft material or scaffold is placed in the socket of the extracted tooth.

== Post-extraction bleeding ==
Post-extraction bleeding is bleeding that occurs 8–12 hours after tooth extraction. It is normal for bleeding to occur for up to 30 minutes following the extraction. It is not uncommon for the extraction site to discharge a small amount of blood or to see saliva blood-stained for up to 8 hours.

Should post-extraction bleeding occur, UK guidance recommends biting onto a piece of damp gauze for at least 20 minutes whilst sitting in an upright position. It is important that the gauze is damp, but not soaking, to avoid disrupting clot formation and consequently inducing a rebound bleed. If the socket continues to bleed, it is recommended to repeat the process with a fresh piece of damp gauze for 20 minutes again. Should both attempts fail to stem the bleed, it is advised to seek professional advice.

=== Factors ===
Various factors contribute to post-extraction bleeding.

Local factors

- Laceration of blood vessels
- Osseous bleeding from nutrients canal/ central vessels
- Inflammation
- Infection
- Traumatic extraction
- Failure of patient to follow post-extraction instructions

Systemic factors

- Platelet problem
- Coagulation disorder/ excessive fibrinolysis
- Inherited/medication-induced problems

=== Type of bleeding ===
1. Primary prolonged bleeding

This type of bleeding occurs during/immediately after extraction, because true haemostasis has not been achieved. It is usually controlled by conventional techniques, such as applying pressure packs or haemostatic agents onto the wound.

2. Reactionary bleeding

This type of bleeding starts 2 to 3 hours after tooth extraction, as a result of cessation of vasoconstriction. Systemic intervention might be required.

3. Secondary bleeding

This type of bleeding usually begins 7 to 10 days post extraction, and is most likely due to infection destroying the blood clot or ulcerating local vessels.

=== Interventions ===
There is no clear evidence from clinical trials comparing the effects of different interventions for the treatment of post-extraction bleeding. In view of the lack of reliable evidence, clinicians must use their clinical experience to determine the most appropriate means of treating this condition, depending on patient-related factors.

== Complications ==
- Infection: The dentist may opt to prescribe antibiotics pre- and/or post-operatively if they determine the patient to be at risk of infection.
- Prolonged bleeding: The dentist has a variety of means at their disposal to address bleeding; however, small amounts of blood mixed in the saliva after extraction are normal, even up to 72 hours after extraction. Usually, however, bleeding will almost completely stop within eight hours of the surgery, with only minuscule amounts of blood mixed with saliva coming from the wound. A gauze compress will significantly reduce bleeding over a period of a few hours.

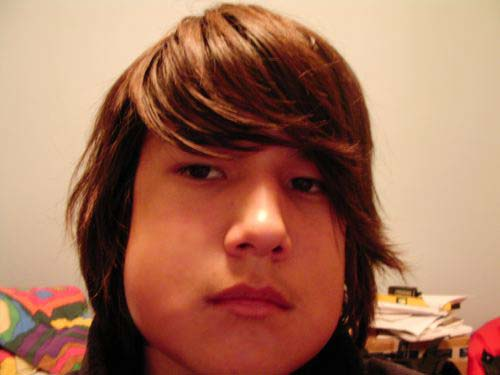
Example of post-operative swelling following third molar (wisdom teeth) extractions.

- Swelling: Often dictated by the amount of surgery performed, to extract a tooth (e.g., surgical insult to the tissues, both hard and soft, surrounding a tooth). Generally, when a surgical flap must be elevated (i.e., the periosteum covering the bone is thus injured), minor to moderate swelling will occur. A poorly cut soft tissue flap, for instance, where the periosteum is torn off rather than cleanly elevated off the underlying bone, will often increase such swelling. Similarly, when bone must be removed using a drill, more swelling is likely to occur.
- Bruising: Bruising may occur as a complication after tooth extraction. Bruising is more common in older people or people on aspirin or steroid therapy. It may take weeks for bruising to disappear completely.
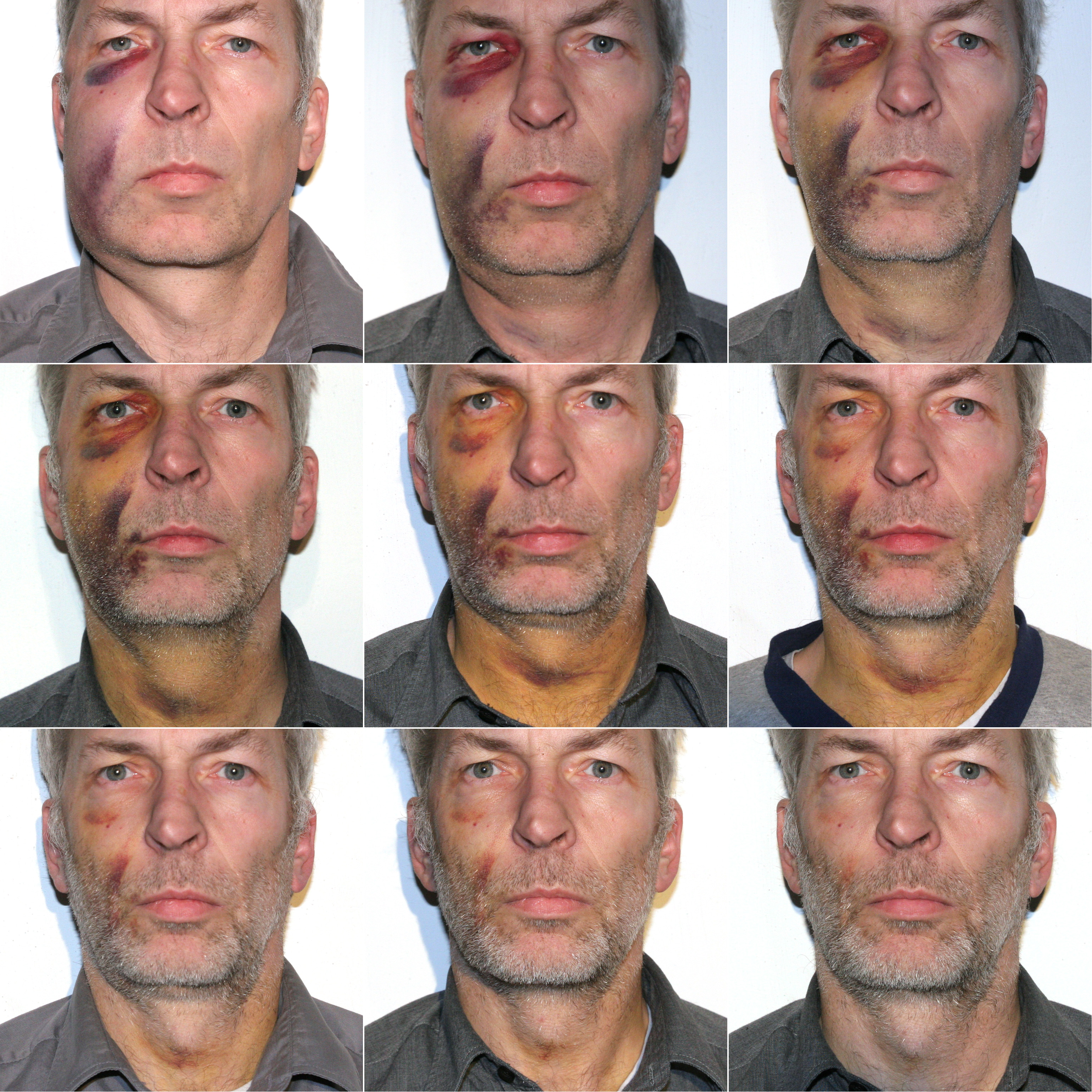
  Recovery of swelling and bruises over time
- Sinus exposure, possibly leading to infection, and oral-antral communication: This can occur when extracting upper molars (and in some patients, upper premolars). The maxillary sinus sits directly above the roots of maxillary molars and premolars. There is a bony floor of the sinus, dividing the tooth socket from the sinus itself. This bone can range from thick to thin, from tooth to tooth, from patient to patient. In some cases it is absent and the root is, in fact, in the sinus. At other times, this bone may be removed with the tooth, or may be perforated during surgical extraction. The doctor typically mentions this risk to patients, based on evaluation of radiographs showing the relationship of the tooth to the sinus. The sinus cavity is lined with a membrane called the Sniderian membrane, which may or may not be perforated. If this membrane is exposed after an extraction, but remains intact, a "sinus exposed" has occurred. If the membrane is perforated, however, it is a "sinus communication". These two conditions are treated differently. In the event of a sinus communication, the dentist may decide to let it heal on its own, or, may need to surgically obtain primary closure—depending on the size of the exposure and the likelihood of the patient to heal. In both cases, a resorbable material called "gelfoam" is typically placed in the extraction site to promote clotting and serve as a framework for granulation tissue to accumulate. Patients are typically provided with prescriptions for antibiotics that cover sinus bacterial flora, decongestants, and careful instructions to follow during the healing period.
- Nerve injury: This is primarily an issue with extraction of third molars, but can occur with the extraction of any tooth should the nerve be close to the surgical site. Two nerves are typically of concern, and are found in duplicate (one left and one right): 1. the inferior alveolar nerve, which enters the mandible at the mandibular foramen and exits the mandible at the sides of the chin from the mental foramen. This nerve supplies sensation to the lower teeth on the right or left half of the dental arch, as well as sense of touch to the right or left half of the chin and lower lip. 2. The lingual nerve (one right and one left), which branches off the mandibular branches of the trigeminal nerve and courses just inside the jaw bone, entering the tongue and supplying sense of touch and taste to the right and left half of the anterior 2/3 of the tongue as well as the lingual gingiva (i.e., the gums on the inside surface of the dental arch). Such injuries can occur while lifting teeth (typically the inferior alveolar), but are most commonly caused by inadvertent damage with a surgical drill. Such injuries are rare and are usually temporary, but depending on the type of injury (i.e., Seddon classification: neuropraxia, axonotmesis, & neurotmesis), can be prolonged or even permanent.
- Displacement of tooth or part of the tooth into the maxillary sinus (upper teeth only). In such cases, the tooth or tooth fragment must almost always be retrieved. In some cases, the sinus cavity can be irrigated with saline (antral lavage) and the tooth fragment may be brought back to the site of the opening through which it entered the sinus, and may be retrievable. At other times, a window must be made into the sinus in the Canine fossa—a procedure referred to as a "Caldwell-Luc".

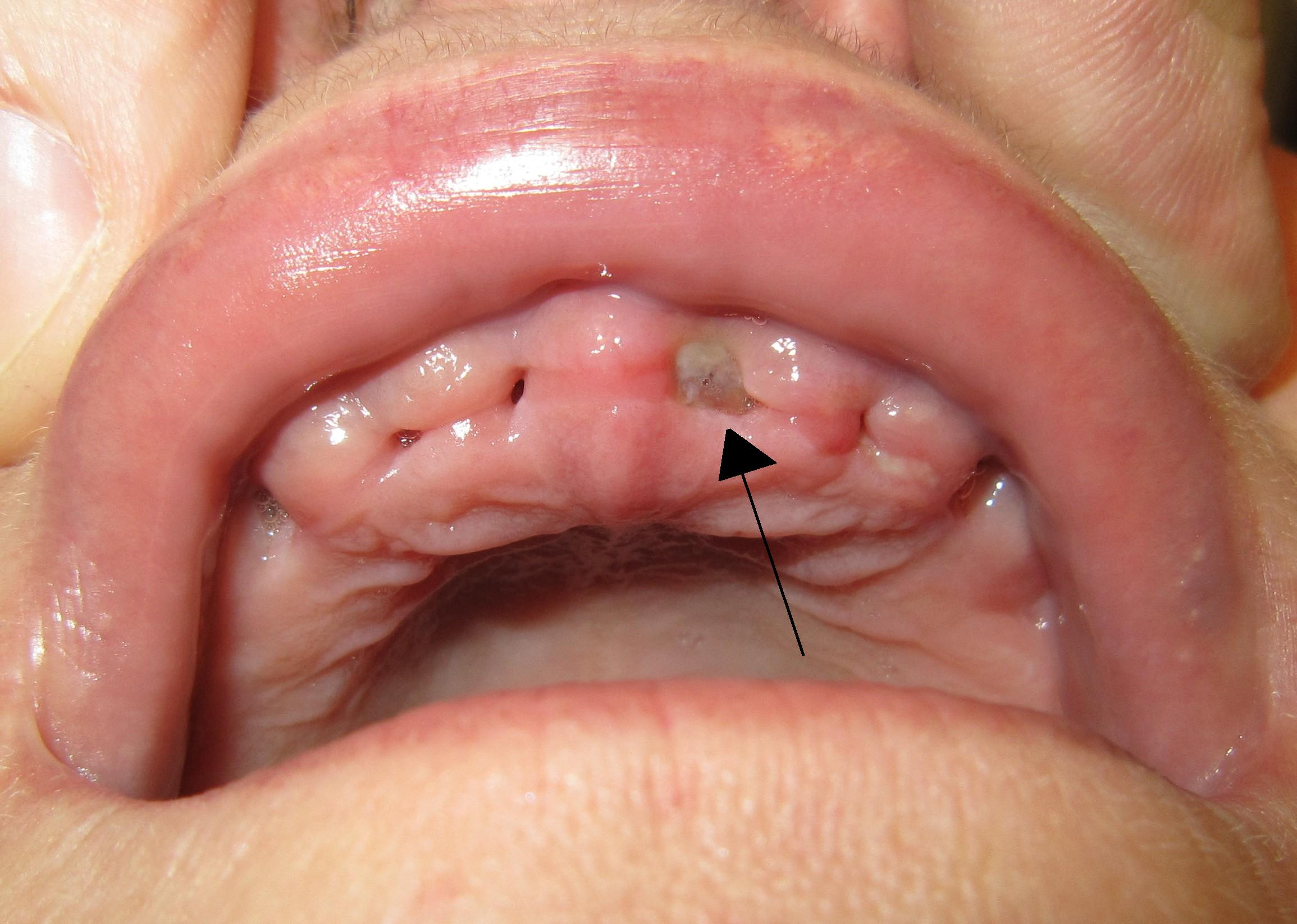
Alveolar osteitis of a socket after tooth extraction. Note lack of blood clot in socket and exposed alveolar bone.

- Dry-socket (Alveolar osteitis) is a painful phenomenon that most commonly occurs a few days after the removal of mandibular (lower) wisdom teeth. It typically occurs when the blood clot within the healing tooth extraction site is disrupted. More likely, alveolar osteitis is a phenomenon of painful inflammation within the empty tooth socket because of the relatively poor blood supply to this area of the mandible (which explains why dry-socket is usually not experienced in other parts of the jaw). Inflamed alveolar bone, unprotected and exposed to the oral environment after tooth extraction, can become packed with food and debris. Dry-socket typically causes a sharp and sudden increase in pain commencing 2–5 days following the extraction of a mandibular molar, most commonly the third molar. This is often extremely unpleasant for the patient; the only symptom of dry-socket is pain, which often radiates up and down the head and neck. A dry-socket is not an infection, and is not directly associated with swelling because it occurs entirely within bone – it is a phenomenon of inflammation, within the bony lining, of an empty tooth socket. Because dry-socket is not an infection, the use of antibiotics has no effect on its rate of occurrence. There is some evidence that rinsing with chlorhexidine before or after extraction or placing chlorhexidine gel in the sockets of extracted teeth provides a benefit in preventing dry-socket, but potential adverse effects of chlorhexidine have to be considered. The risk factor for alveolar osteitis can dramatically increase with smoking after an extraction.
- Bone fragments: Particularly when extraction of molars is involved, it is not uncommon for the bones which formerly supported the tooth to shift and in some cases to erupt through the gums, presenting protruding sharp edges which can irritate the tongue and cause discomfort. This is distinguished from a similar phenomenon, where, broken fragments of bone or tooth left over from the extraction can also protrude through the gums. In the latter case, the fragments will usually work their way out on their own. In the former case, the protrusions can either be snipped off by the dentist, or eventually the exposed bone will erode away on its own.
- Maxilla tuberosity fracture: Can occur especially during molar extractions. There can be a variety of factors causing this including single standing molar, extracting in the wrong order, inadequate alveolar support, pathological gemination or extension of maxillary sinus weakening the area.
- Trismus: Trismus, also known as lockjaw, affects functions of the oral cavity by restricting opening of the mouth. A double blind, clinical study was done to test the effect of two different medications on post-extraction trismus. The patients who received a corticosteroid by IV had a statistically significant lower level of trismus when compared to patients receiving an NSAID by IV or no medication.
- Loss of a tooth: If an extracted tooth slips out of the forceps, it may be swallowed or inhaled. The patient may be aware of swallowing it, or, they may cough, which suggests inhalation of the tooth. The patient must be referred for a chest X-ray in hospital if a tooth cannot be found. If it has been swallowed, no action is necessary as it usually passes through the alimentary canal without doing any harm. But if it has been inhaled, an urgent operation is necessary to recover it from the airway or lung before it causes serious complications such as pneumonia or a lung abscess.
- Luxation of the adjacent tooth: The application of force during the extraction procedure must strictly be limited to the tooth that requires the extraction. Most cases of surgical extraction procedures require that the forces are diverted from the tooth itself to areas such as bone surrounding the tooth to ensure adequate bone removal before proceeding any further in the extraction procedure. Either way, the forces applied by various instruments during both simple and complicated surgical procedure may loosen the teeth present both in front of or behind the tooth depending upon the impact direction and location of the force being applied and that happening only if the forces divert from the actual tooth that needs extraction. Such deleterious forces may weaken the anchorage of adjacent teeth from within their bony socket, and hence result in weakening of the adjacent teeth.
- Extraction of the wrong tooth: Misdiagnosis, altered tooth morphology, faulty clinical examination, poor patient history, undetected/unmentioned previous extractions that may predispose the operator to consider another tooth to be a replicate of the one previously extracted are a few causes of extraction of a wrong tooth.
- Osteonecrosis: Osteonecrosis of the jaw is the slow destruction of bone in an extraction site. A case control study of 191 cases and 573 controls were used to understand the relationship between osteonecrosis of the jaw and prior usage of bisphosphonate drugs, which are commonly prescribed to treat osteoporosis. All of the participants were over 40 years of age, mostly female, and had been taking bisphosphonates for six months or longer. The presence of osteonecrosis of the jaw was reported by dentists' previous diagnosis of the participating case and control patient's medical records. Reports showed that women using bisphosphonates for more than two years are ten times more likely to experience osteonecrosis of the jaw, while women who have taken bisphosphonates for less than two years are four times more likely to suffer from osteonecrosis of the jaw when compared to women who were not taking bisphosphonates. Therefore, it is extremely important to report all medications used to the dentist before an extraction, so that osteonecrosis can be avoided.

== Atraumatic extraction ==
Atraumatic extraction is a novel technique for extracting teeth with minimal trauma to the bone and surrounding tissues. It is especially useful in patients who are highly susceptible to complications such as bleeding, necrosis, or jaw fracture. It can also preserve bone for subsequent implant placement. Techniques involve minimal use of forceps, which damage socket walls, relying instead on luxators, elevators and syndesmotomy.

== Replacement options for missing teeth ==
Following dental extraction, a gap is left. The options to fill this gap are commonly recorded as Bind, and the choice is made by dentist and patient based on several factors.

Treatment option	Advantages	Disadvantages
Bridge	Fixed to adjacent teeth	Drilling usually required on one or both sides of the gap if conventional bridge (average lifespan about 10 years). Conservative bridge (average lifespan about 5 years) preparation may cause minimal damage to adjacent teeth. Expensive and complex treatment, not suited to all situations, e.g., large gaps in the back of the mouth Alveolar bone will still resorb, and eventually a gap may show under bridge.
Implant	Fixed to jawbone. Maintains alveolar bone, which would otherwise undergo resorption. Usually a long-term lifespan.	Expensive and complex, requiring specialist. May involve other procedures such as bone grafting. Relatively contra-indicated in tobacco smokers.
Denture	Often a simple, quick, and relatively cheap treatment compared to bridge and implant. Usually, no drilling of other teeth required. It is far easier to replace several teeth with a denture than place multiple bridges or implants.	Denture is not fixed in mouth. Over time worsens periodontal disease unless there is good level of oral hygiene, and may damage soft tissues. Potential for slightly accelerated resorption of alveolar bone compared to no denture. Potential for poor tolerance in persons with over-sensitive gag reflex, xerostomia, etc.
Nothing (i.e., not replacing the missing tooth)	Often the choice due to cost of other treatment or lack of motivation for other treatments. Part of a shortened dental arch plan, which revolves around the fact that not all teeth are required to eat comfortably, and only the incisors and premolars need be preserved for normal function. This is usually the choice taken if the reason of dental extraction is due to impacted wisdom teeth or orthodontics because of limited space.	The alveolar bone will slowly resorb over time once the tooth is lost. Potential esthetic concern. Potential for drifting and rotation of adjacent teeth into the gap over time.

== History ==
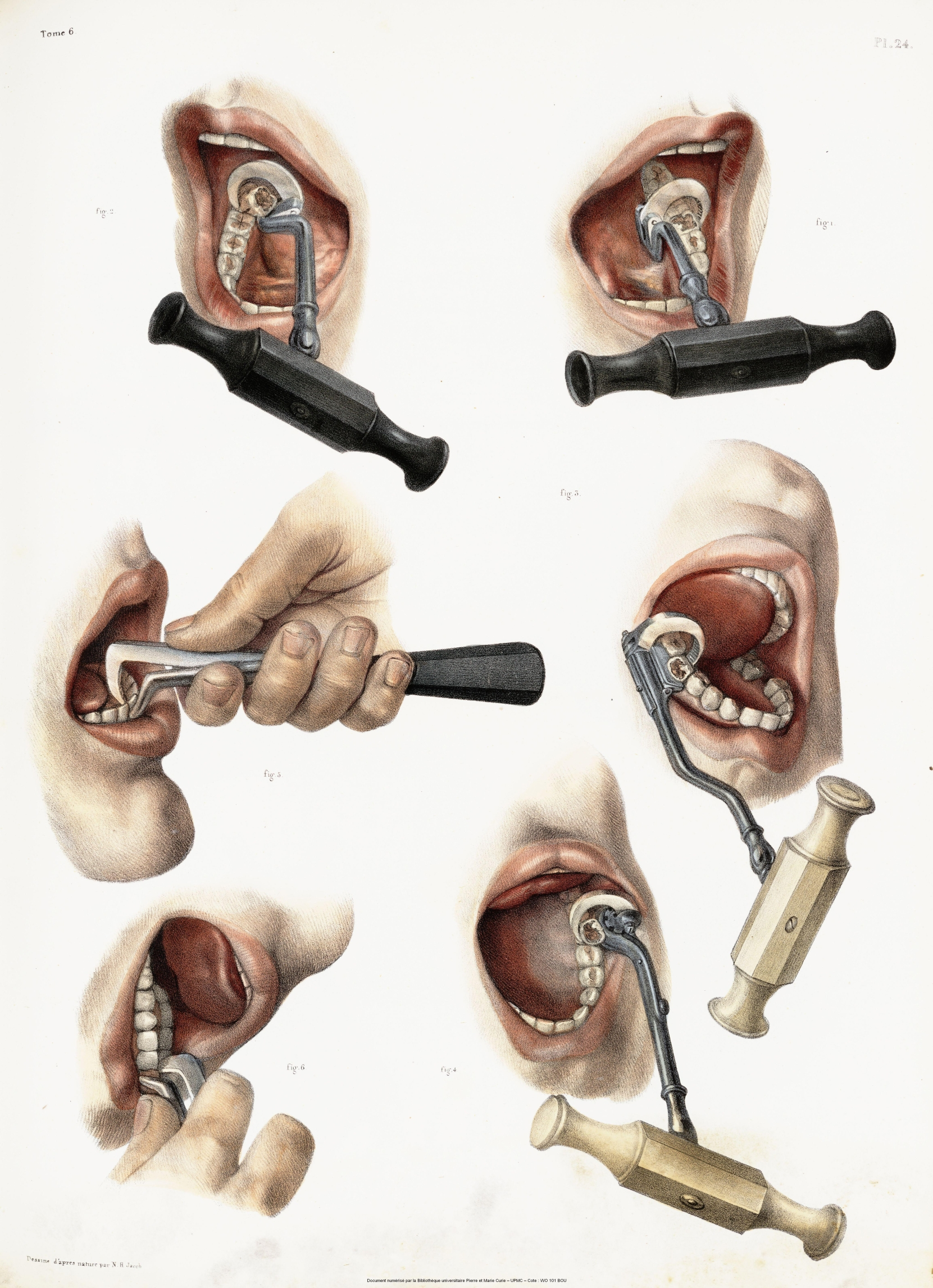
illustration demonstrating the use of the dental key for extracting teeth.

Historically, dental extractions have been used to treat a variety of illnesses. Before the discovery of antibiotics, chronic tooth infections were often linked to a variety of health problems, and therefore removal of a diseased tooth was a common treatment for various medical conditions. Instruments used for dental extractions date back several centuries. In the 14th century, Guy de Chauliac invented the dental pelican, which was used through the late 18th century. The pelican was replaced by the dental key which, in turn, was replaced by modern forceps in the 19th century. As dental extractions can vary tremendously in difficulty, depending on the patient and the tooth, a wide variety of instruments exist to address specific situations. Rarely, tooth extraction was used as a method of torture, e.g., to obtain forced confessions.

== See also ==
- Tooth regeneration
- Dental evulsion
