= Dental key =

Tool to pull out teeth

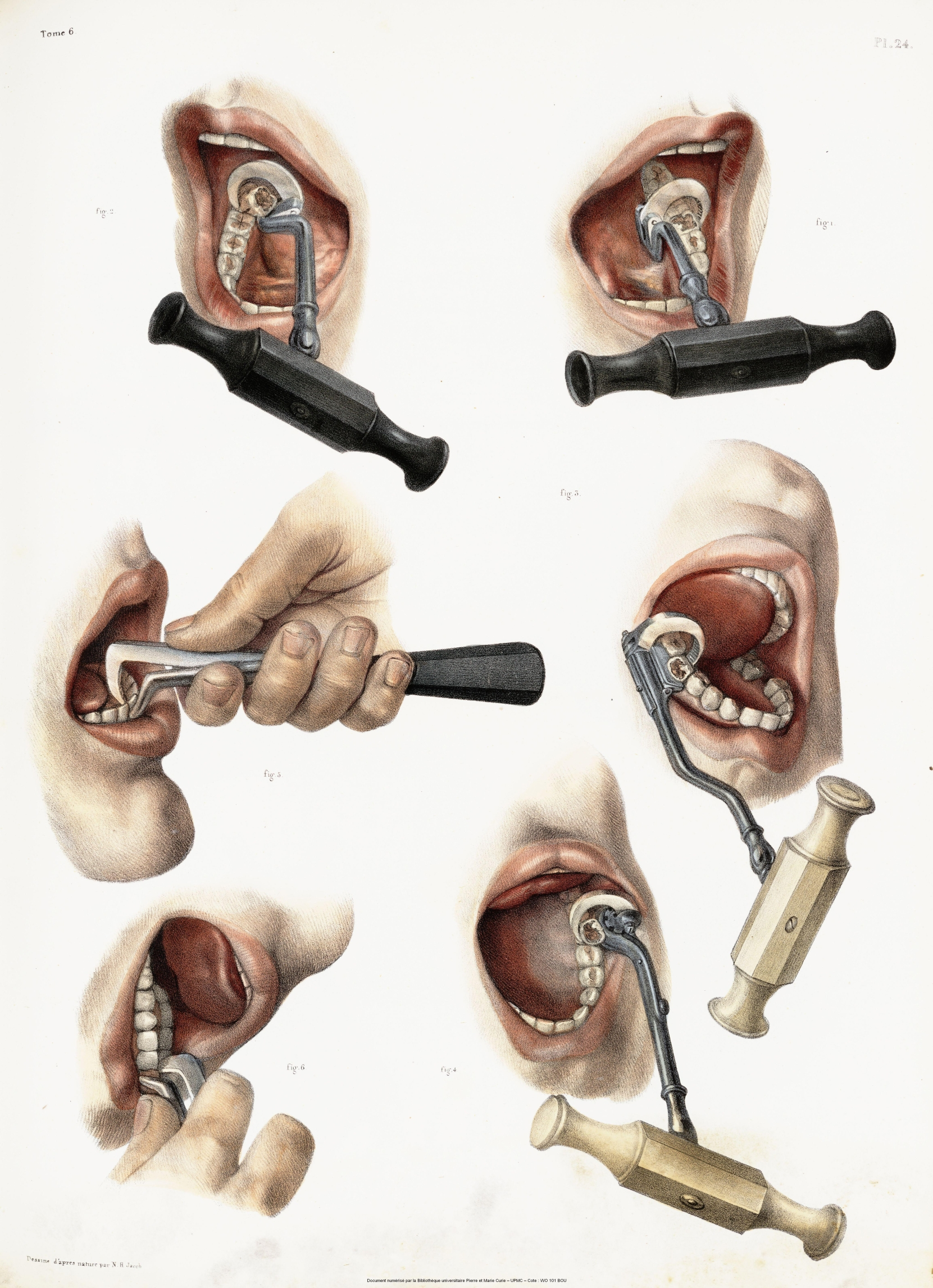
llustration demonstrating the use of the dental key for extracting teeth

The dental key is an instrument that was used in dentistry to extract diseased teeth. Before the era of antibiotics, dental extraction was often the method of choice to treat dental infections, and extraction instruments date back several centuries.

== History ==
The dental key, (also known as Clef de Garengeot, Fothergill-Key, English-Key, Dimppel Extractor or Tooth Key) was first mentioned in Alexander Monro's Medical Essays and Observations in 1742, but had probably been in use since around 1730. It remained popular into the 20th century when it was replaced by the more modern forceps.

== Design and use ==
Modeled after a door key, the dental key was used by first inserting the instrument horizontally into the mouth, then its "claw" would be tightened over a tooth. The instrument was rotated to loosen the tooth. This often resulted in the tooth breaking, causing jaw fractures and soft tissue damage.

The design of the dental key evolved over the years. The original design featured a straight shaft, which caused it to exert pressure on the tooth next to the one being extracted. This led to a newer design in 1765 by F. J. Leber where the shaft was slightly bent. In 1796 the claw was fixed via a swivel enabling it to be set in various positions by a spring-catch. Newer designs, such as those manufactured by medical instrument maker Charriere featured interchangeable claws. By the end of the 19th century, the introduction of forceps made popular notably by Sir John Tomes, rendered the tooth key mostly obsolete. However, a modern version of the dental key, the Dimppel Extractor, briefly revitalized its use later in the 20th century.

== See also ==
- Dental cavities
- Elevator (dental)
