= William Warwick James =

Dentist and maxillofacial surgeon (1874–1965)

William Warwick James, OBE FRCS MCh FDS FLS, (September 20, 1874 – September 14, 1965) was a dental surgeon in London who also held honorary hospital appointments. In WWI he volunteered to work at the Third London Hospital treating maxillofacial injuries and in 1940, together with BW Fickling, published ‘Injuries of the Face and Jaws’.

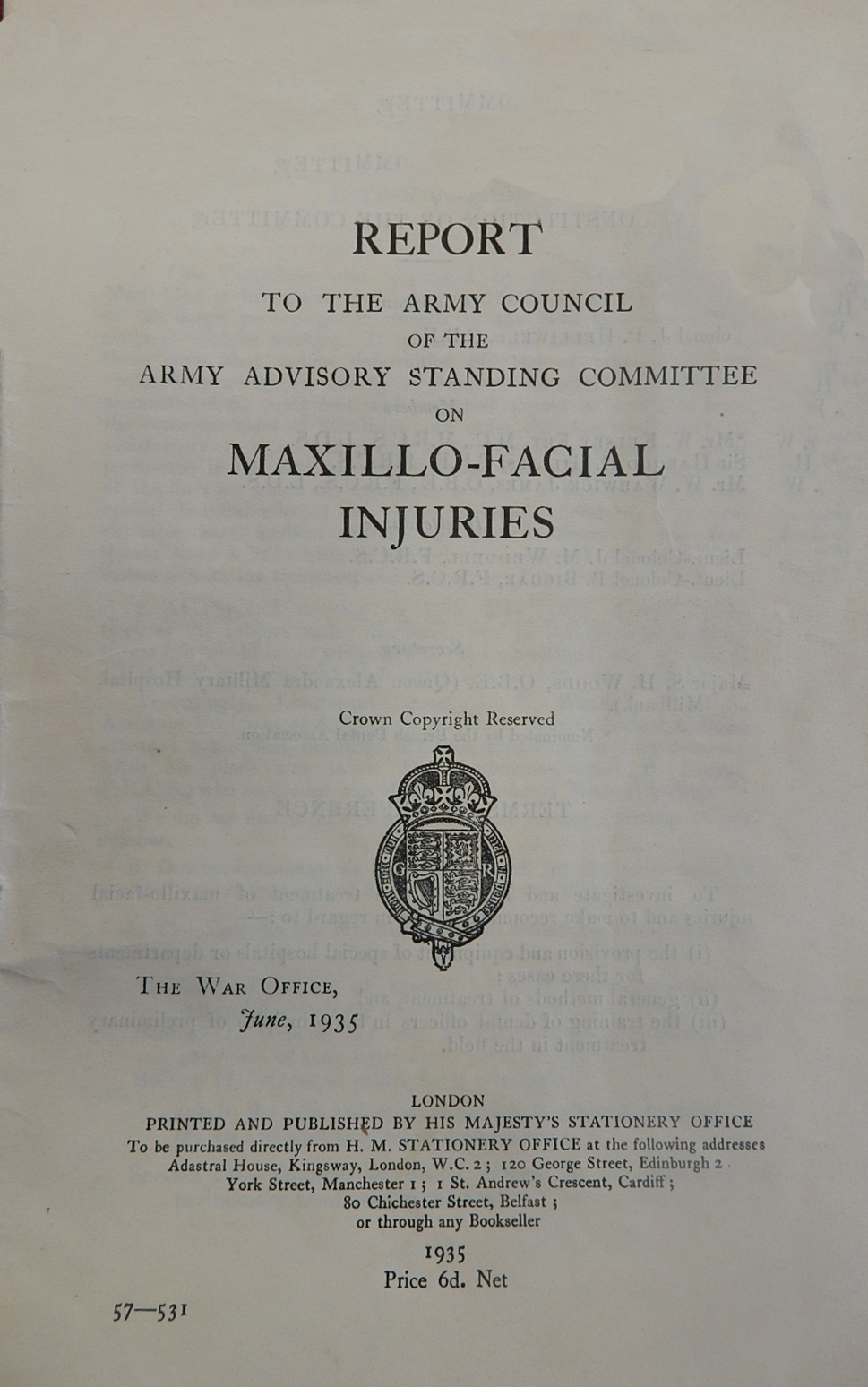
The report was to define the evolution of plastic and maxillofacial surgery. It contained advise on treatment methods and disagreement. Warwick James differed from Gillies and Kelsey-Fry on the best method of immobilizing broken jaws.

Warwick James had a defining influence on the development of plastic and oral and maxillofacial surgery in the United Kingdom as, together with dentist William Kelsey Fry and plastic surgeon Harold Gillies, he sat on the Standing Advisory Committee to the Army Council on the management of maxillofacial injuries.This was set up to advise on how these injuries should be managed in the event of another European war; the committee reported in 1935. Specialist hospitals were set up, based on this report, and remained after WWII and were absorbed into the National Health Service. They defined the evolution of plastic and oral and maxillofacial surgery for several decades afterwards.

== Early life and education ==
Warwick James was born in Wellingborough, Northamptonshire, England. His father, also named William Warwick James, was a local grocer who had a library, which allowed young William to develop a broad knowledge base. He attended Wellingborough School, where he excelled in mathematics and other subjects.

== Professional Training ==
After leaving Wellingborough School Warwick James decided to pursue a career in dentistry and became an apprentice to William Hodgskin Hope, a local practitioner. After three years he decided to follow a more formal path and undertook training at the Royal Dental Hospital of London where he attended the dental anatomy lectures of John Tomes. He qualified in 1898 with the Licentiate in Dental Surgery of the Royal College of Surgeons of England (LDS.RCS). He followed that with medical training at the Middlesex Hospital Medical School and qualified in 1902 with Membership of the Royal College of Surgeons, Licentiate of the Royal College of Physicians (MRCS,LRCP). Within three years he passed the Fellow of the Royal College of Surgeons examination (FRCS) He was awarded the Fellowship in Dental Surgery of the Royal College of Surgeons of England (FDS.RCS) in 1947 when the Faculty of Dental Surgery was founded.

== Dental Practice and Hospital Appointments ==
Warwick James practiced routine dentistry at his private home in 2 Park Crescent London and held hospital appointments. His hospital appointments were honorary so his dental practice must have been lucrative. The 1911 census showed that his household consisted of six servants as well as his four children, himself and his wife.

He was appointed to the staff of the Great Ormond Street Hospital for sick children at the age of 30, the Royal Dental Hospital at 33 and the Middlesex Hospital at the age of 39. In the hospitals he practiced what subsequently became known as Oral Surgery as well as teaching students and young dentists, lecturing and research.

== War Injury Work ==
In 1915 Warwick James was in France with the Anglo-French Red Cross where he met Auguste Charles Valadier, dental surgeon who became a pioneer in the treatment of maxillofacial injuries in WWI and Varaztad Kazanjian, an American oral surgeon who became a Professor of Plastic Surgery; he also was involved with facial injuries. The latter became a life long friend. He was then appointed as dental surgeon to the 3rd London General Hospital, in Wandsworth. This was a military hospital set up in 1914 for the treatment of war injuries in the Royal Victoria Patriotic School Wandsworth.

After the war he transferred all his clinical notes, X-rays, dental models, appliances and face masks to his house in London. When WWII came they became the basis for the book: 'Injuries of the Jaws and Face' which he co-authored with Benjamin Fickling. The book was published in 1940 and became the standard textbook on the management of facial injuries in Britain.

== Clinical Interests and Research ==
At Great Ormond Street Hospital, he took an interest in the dates of tooth eruption in children, recording his results of many children. He worked with an ENT surgeon on mouth breathing. He promoted the removal of the thin lingual plate of the mandible during third molar removal to allow drainage of any post operative infection. He accomplished this with chisels in what was a precursor to the later commonly used lingual split technique which is now obsolete. He avoided using dental elevators to remove teeth as he believed the pressure on adjacent bone produced post operative pain. However, he designed some eponymous dental elevators which are still routinely used in the 21st century. He wrote many observational papers in the professional literature and researched into the aetiology of dental caries and periodontal (gum) disease. He made a collection of odontomes (benign tumours of dental tissue) which were exhibited at a British Dental Association conference and were used to produce a new classification of the tumours.

== Zoology Research ==
Warwick James was a member of the Zoological Society of London and participated in research, particularly after his retirement. He collected dental material from different species and wrote a book about the jaws and teeth of primates. He wrote a comparison of dentine among different animals.

== Honours and awards ==
In 1923 he was awarded the John Tomes prize of the Royal College of Surgeons for his research work. In 1944, following his honorary work at the Dental Unit at Birmingham University during WWII, he was made an honorary staff member and given the honorary degree of MCh. He was made an Officer of the Order of the British Empire (OBE) in recognition of his war work in WWI.

The Royal Dental Hospital of London established and eponymous lecture in his name. In 1960 he had made a gift to establish a research fund to continue the work of his teacher John Tomes, and Charles Tomes, in the subjects of dental anatomy.

== Legacy ==
William Warwick James was remembered as one of the most influential researchers in dental and jaw disease of his time, as well as comparative dental anatomy. The book he co-authored with Benjamin Fickling on facial injuries became the standard text on the subject in WWII. The 1935 report he made with William Kelsey Fry and Harold Gillies to the Army Council led to specialist hospitals for facial injuries in WWII which laid the foundations for the evolution of maxillofacial and plastic surgery in the United Kingdom in the second half of the twentieth century.
