= Elevator (dental) =

Dental instrument

Dental elevator
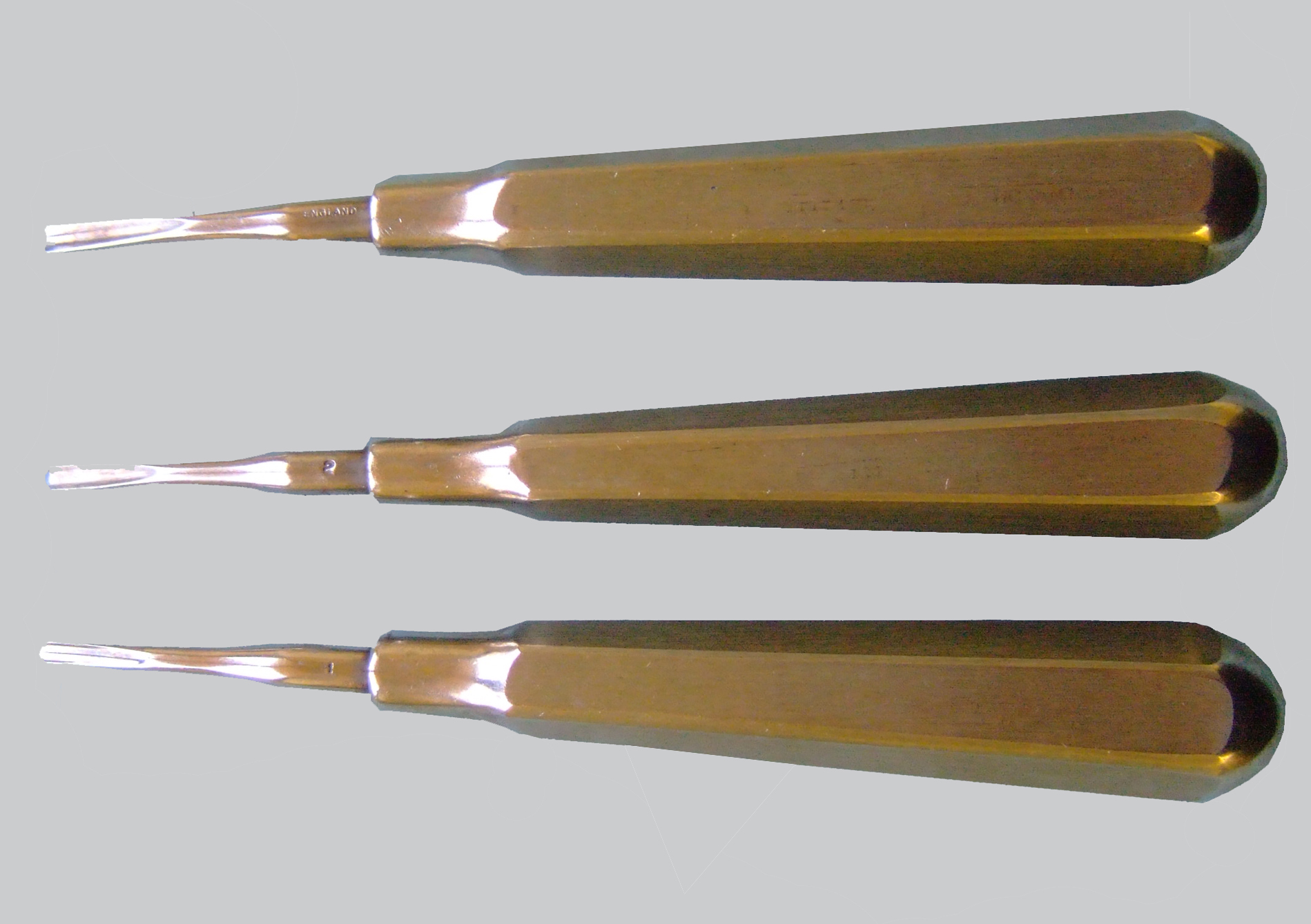
- A standard straight elevator used for luxating teeth.
- Other names: Exolever; Luxator
- Specialty: Oral surgery, dentistry
- Uses: Tooth extraction, luxation of teeth, removal of root fragments
- Types: Straight (Coupland); Coupland's; Cryer (Triangle); Warwick James; Apexo
- MeSH: D003814
- [edit on Wikidata]

Elevators (also known as luxators) are instruments used in dental extractions. They may be used to loosen teeth prior to forceps extraction, to remove roots or impacted teeth, when teeth are compromised and susceptible to fracture or when they are malpositioned and cannot be reached with forceps.

== Mechanics ==
Elevators work on the principle of leverage to dislodge a tooth from its socket. The fulcrum is usually the crest of the socket bone; however, adjacent teeth can be used if they are also to be extracted. The contact point on the tooth or root surface where force is delivered is described as the purchase point, and the position of this can be idealised by cutting bone or sectioning teeth. With root picks especially, a slot or notch may be cut into the root surface to obtain a purchase point.

== Varieties ==
Instruments can be broadly classed as elevators or luxators. Conventional elevators are bulkier and are designed to withstand leverage and torquing forces. Luxating elevators are thinner and sharper, for more delicate use in severing and wedging the ligament.

There are three main types of elevator. Straight elevators e.g. Coupland's or Warwick James' (developed by William Warwick James) have one concave and one convex aspect to the tip and are used for wedging.Triangular elevators e.g. Cryer's or Winter's have a lateral point and are used to deliver class I leverage. Especially when combined with a T-bar, these can deliver large forces and risk jaw fracture. Pick elevators are used to engage root tips.

== See also ==
- Dental key
