= Oxidized cellulose =

Clinical data
- ATC code: B02BC02 (WHO)

Identifiers
- CAS Number: 9032-53-5
- ChemSpider: none
- UNII: 44AIH82TSC

Oxidized cellulose is a water-insoluble derivative of cellulose. It can be produced from cellulose by the action of an oxidizing agent, such as chlorine, hydrogen peroxide, peracetic acid, chlorine dioxide, nitrogen dioxide, persulfates, permanganate, dichromate-sulfuric acid, hypochlorous acid, hypohalites or periodates and a variety of metal catalysts. Oxidized cellulose may contain carboxylic acid, aldehyde, and/or ketone groups, in addition to the original hydroxyl groups of the starting material, cellulose, depending on the nature of the oxidant and reaction conditions.

It is an antihemorrhagic. It works both by absorbing the blood (similar to a cotton ball) and by triggering the contact activation system. It is poorly absorbed and may cause healing complications postoperatively.

== See also ==
- Regenerated cellulose
