= Antral lavage =

Surgical procedure

- Specialty: Otorhinolaryngology
- [edit on Wikidata]

Antral lavage is a largely obsolete surgical procedure in which a cannula is inserted into the maxillary sinus via the inferior meatus to allow irrigation and drainage of the sinus. It is also called proof puncture, as the presence of an infection can be proven during the procedure. Upon presence of infection, it can be considered as therapeutic puncture. Often, multiple repeated lavages are subsequently required to allow for full washout of infection.

In contemporary practice, endoscopic sinus surgery has largely replaced antral lavage and as such, it is rarely performed.

== Medical uses ==
It can be used as therapeutic procedure for:

- Acute and chronic maxillary sinusitis not responding to medical treatment.
- Chronic infections not responding to treatments.
- Irrigating and washing out collected purulent secretions.
- Dental maxillary sinusitis.
- Oro-antral fistula if associated with sinusitis.
- Acute Bacterial Rhinosinusitis. Though it is indicated only in severe cases not as a regular treatment.

It can be also used as diagnostic procedure for:

- Carrying out culture and sensitivity test if the returning fluid is mucopurulent or purulent in Chronic Sinusitis.
- Exfoliative cytology of the returning fluid to rule out any malignancy.

== Contraindications ==
Age: Below the age of 3 years, as the size of the sinus is small due to underdeveloped Maxillary Sinus.

Bleeding disorders: May lead to epistaxis.

Fracture of maxilla: Antral Lavage may result in escape of the fluid through fracture lines.

Febrile stage of acute maxillary sinusitis: May cause osteomyelitis of Maxilla.

Procedure is contraindicated in diabetic and hypertensive patients.

Acute maxillary sinusitis not resolving on medical treatment.

== Instruments ==
The following instruments are used in the procedure:

- Tilley's Forceps
- Lichtwitz Antral Trocar Cannula
- Higginson's Rubber Syringe
- Nasal Speculum

== Diagnosis of antral pathology ==
1. Watery, amber color fluid flowing from cannula, immediately on puncture and containing cholesterol crystals, indicates presence of cyst.
2. Blobs of mucopus in washings indicates hyperplastic sinusitis.
3. Presence of frank, foul-smelling pus, which easily mixes with irrigating fluid indicates suppuration and in such cases, antral wash may be repeated once or twice a week.
4. Plain Radiological X-rays (Water's view) of sinuses is most specific non- invasive method of diagnosing Antral pathology.

== Difficulties ==
The following difficulties may arise during antral lavage:

- Hard Bone: The wall of the maxillary sinus may be hard, rendering the procedure difficult.
- Touching the posterior wall of the sinus by the tip of the cannula may block the cannula and the fluid may not return on pumping the higginson syringe. The cannula is slightly withdrawn and it becomes patent.
- Blocked ostium: If the ostium of the sinus is blocked, the fluid doesn't return through it. To bypass the ostium, one more trocar and cannula are inserted at the site of the first one, a fluid returns through the other cannula.

== Complications ==
1. Vasovagal shock: Due to over stimulation of the vagus nerve, the patient may become pale, may faint and fall down and the pulse rate may decrease.
2. Bleeding may occur at the site of the puncture which stops in a short time with cotton wool plug.
3. False passages into cheek or orbit leading to emphysema or extravasation of fluid into the cheek or lower eyelid or orbit. Also may lead to cerebrospinal fluid leak and haematoma.
4. Infection in the maxillary sinus is common.
5. Anaesthetic complications may occur.
6. Air embolism.

== Repetition ==
If the returning fluid is purulent, one repeats the puncture after a week. If more than three successive puncture shows returning fluid to be persistently purulent, the patient may require functional endoscopic sinus surgery (FESS) and occasionally may need Caldwell-Luc operation.

As antral Washout is a much simpler procedure compared to FESS, it may be done on an outpatient basis for Subacute Maxillary Sinusitis. However, FESS remains gold standard in treatment of Chronic Maxillary Sinusitis.

== Post operative ==
1. Patient lies down for 10–15 minutes after operation and pack is removed after an hour.
2. Antibiotic should be given for 5–6 days in cases of suppuration depending upon culture and sensitivity.
3. Oral and local decongestant are given to improve the patency of ostium.
4. Analgesics may be required for post-operative headache.

== Newer techniques ==
- Luma Wire Transillumination: This technique has a number of advantages over antral Lavage, such as:

1) Discovery of the location of the Maxillary Sinus with greater accuracy.
2) A general improvement in safety of the procedure.
3) The ability to obtain cultures at the time of lavage, when clinically warranted or indicated by CT-scan evidence.
4) Avoiding the need for exposure to radiation, as fluorescence is used in its stead.
5) Lack of interference in anatomy.

- Functional Endoscopic Sinus Surgery (FESS) is one of the newer modalities in treatment of Chronic Sinusitis. However, it is not first line of treatment as it may lead to massive bleeding. It allows ventilation and drainage of inflamed or infected sinuses and restoration of mucociliary clearances. It has proven to be very effective in treatment of acute and chronic sinusitis.
