= Coupland's elevators =

Dentistry instruments

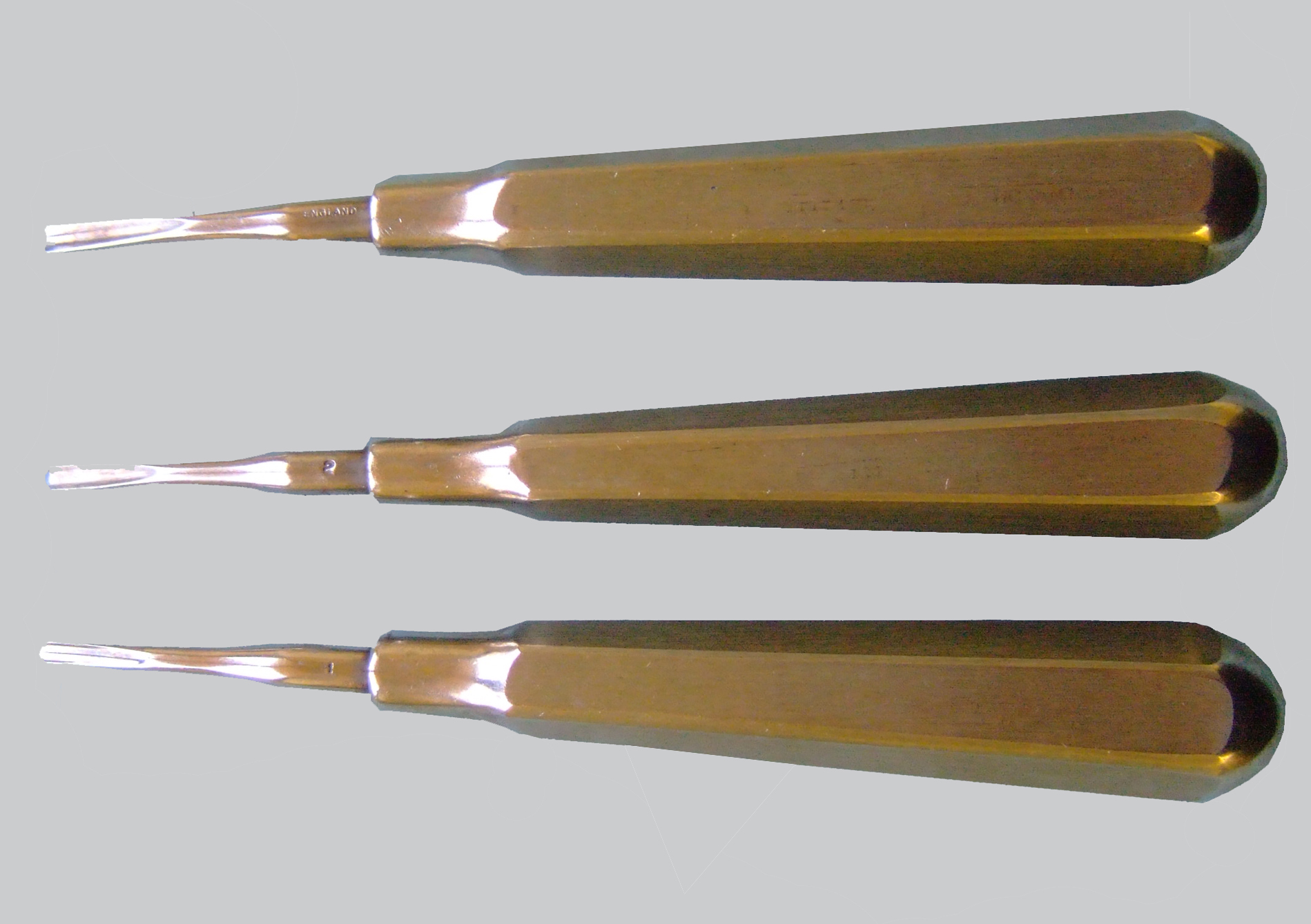
- There are three sizes usually used sequentially for dental extraction
- Synonyms: Coupland's chisels
- Specialty: Dentistry, Oral surgery
- Intervention: Dental extraction
- Inventor(s): Douglas C. W. Coupland
- Invention date: 1920s
- Manufacturer: Hu-Friedy (original)
- Related items: Warwick James elevator, Cryer elevator
- [edit on Wikidata]

Coupland's elevators (also known as chisels) are instruments commonly used for dental extraction. They are used in sets of three each of increasing size and are used to split multi-rooted teeth and are inserted between the bone and tooth roots and rotated to elevate them out of the sockets. The instruments were designed by Dr Douglas C W Coupland who qualified as a dental surgeon in Toronto in 1922 and spent most of his career practising dentistry in Ottawa where he specialised in dental extraction. Coupland designed the instruments in the 1920s; they were manufactured by the Hu-Friedy company and sold from the early 1930s initially as sets of eight or twelve which were later reduced to three. Coupland also designed a set of dental suckers with interchangeable tips.
