= Mouth mirror =

Dentistry instrument

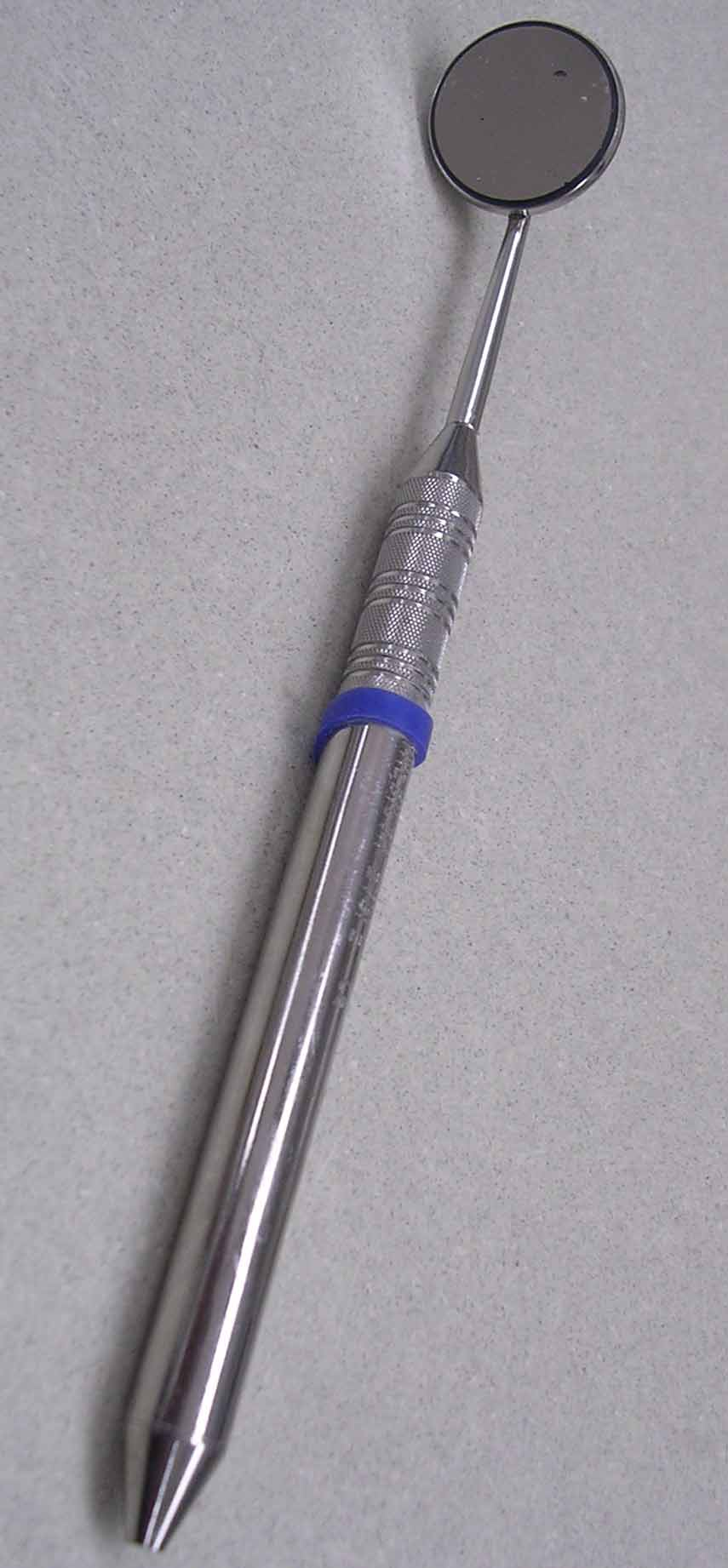
A mouth mirror (US norm)

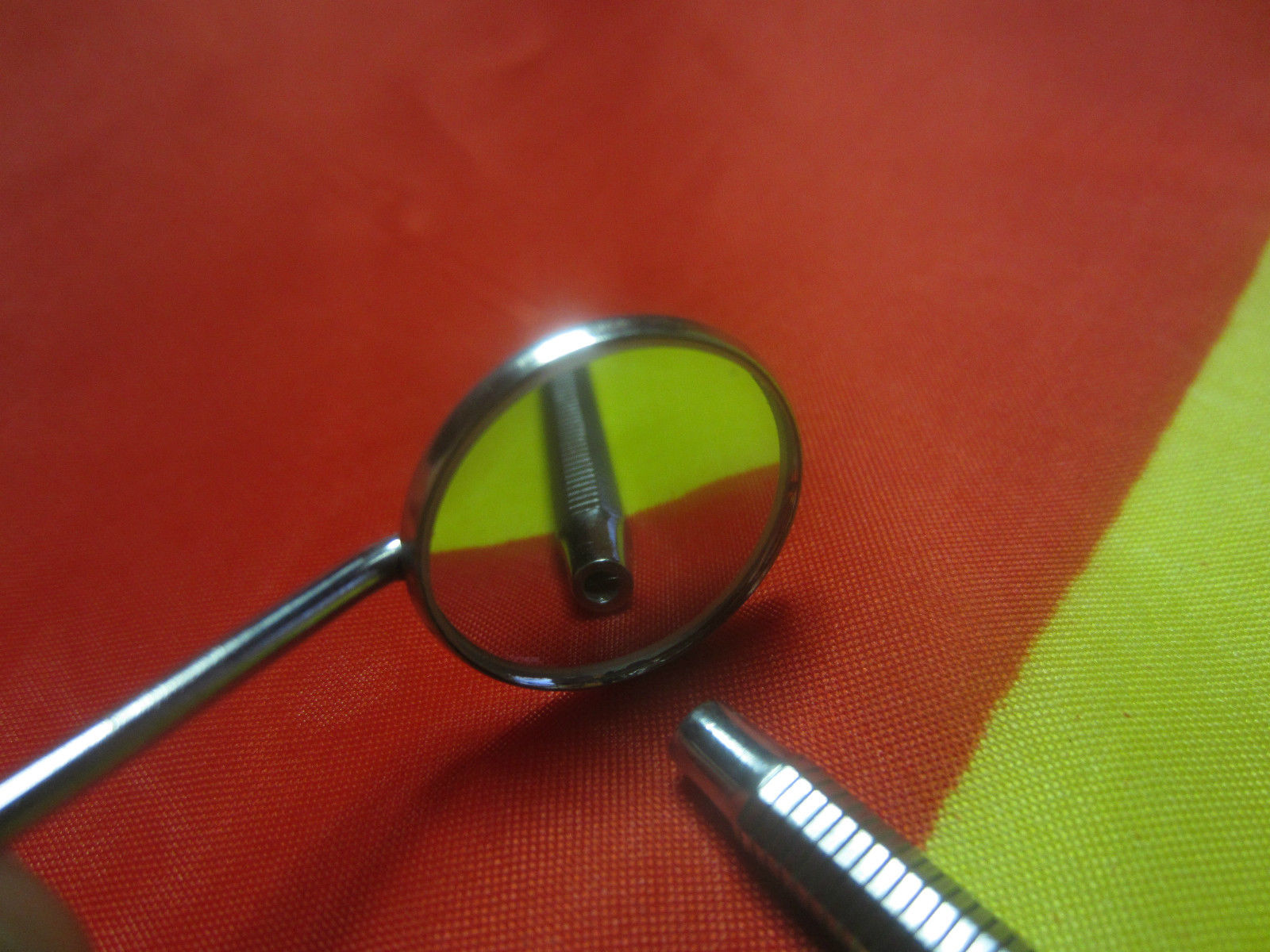
Mouth mirror (European norm)

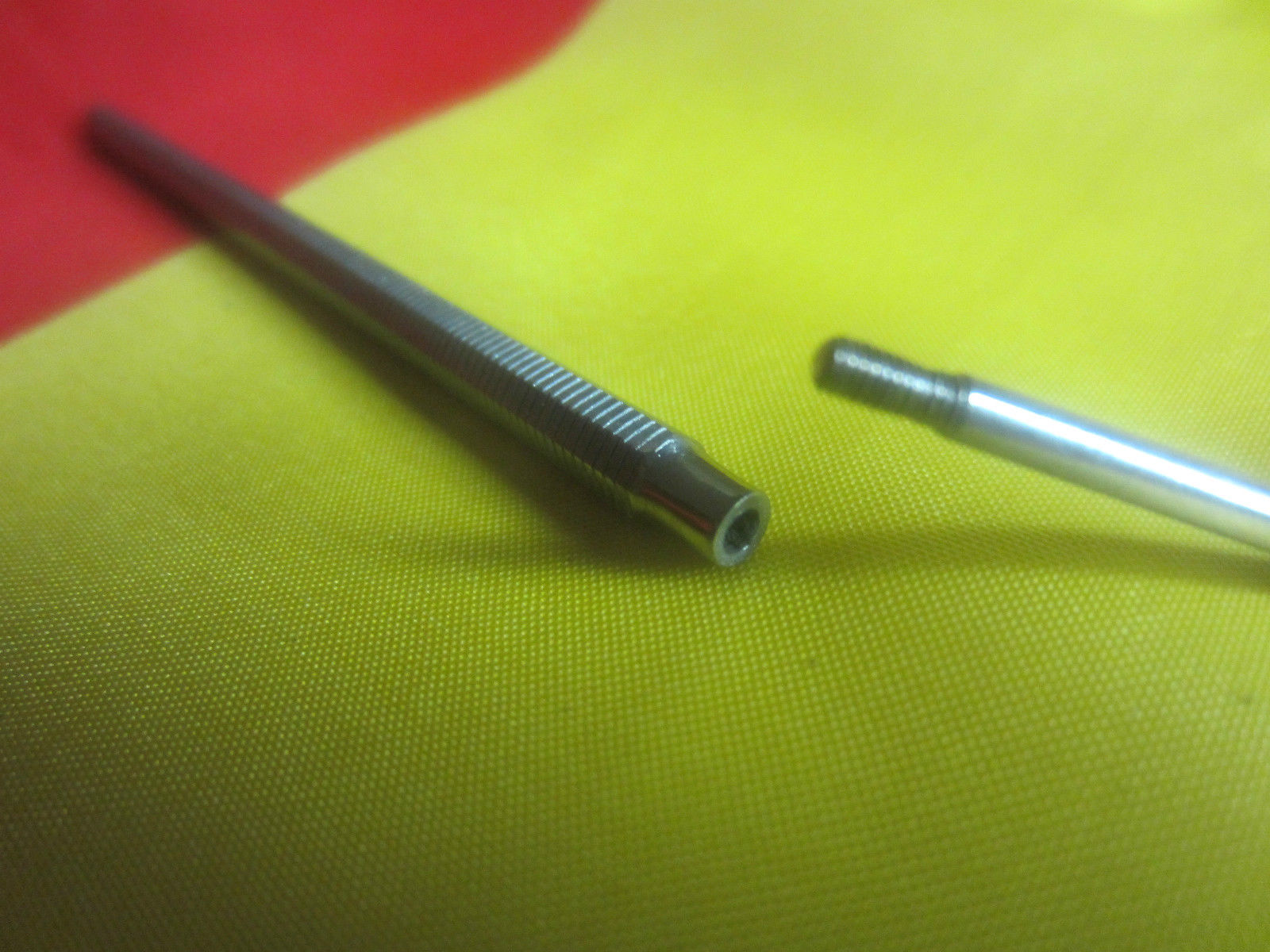
Mouth mirror handle (European norm)

A mouth mirror or dentist's mirror is an instrument used in dentistry. The head of the mirror is usually round, and the most common sizes used are No. 4 (⌀ 18 mm) and No. 5 (⌀ 20 mm). A No. 2 is sometimes used when a smaller mirror is needed, such as when working on back teeth with a dental dam in place. The mouth mirror has a wide range of uses. Three of its most important functions are allowing indirect vision by the dentist, reflecting light onto desired surfaces, and retraction of soft tissues. There exist 2 different norms of the thread that are not compatible with each other. The US norm has a taper thread and is mostly used in the United States, Canada, Spain, and South Korea.

Indirect vision is needed in certain locations of the mouth where visibility is difficult or impossible. The posterior (or lingual) surfaces of the anterior maxillary teeth is a notable area where mouth mirrors are often used. Other areas of the mouth can be viewed more readily with the mouth mirror, even though it would be possible to see them if the dentist or dental hygienist adjusted their body into a poor position. Without the mouth mirror, poor body positioning would occur daily and lead to chronic postural problems, especially in the back and neck.

Other areas of the mouth are difficult to light, even with overhead dentists' lights. The mouth mirror is used in these cases to reflect light onto those surfaces. This is especially useful if the mirror is also being used for indirect vision of a dark area.

Furthermore, the mouth mirror is used to retract tissues such as the tongue or cheeks to improve visibility of the teeth.

Dentist's mirrors are also commonly used by engineers to allow vision in tight spaces and around corners in equipment. They are a common tool in optics and laser labs as well.
