= Debridement (dental) =

Removal of plaque and calculus from teeth

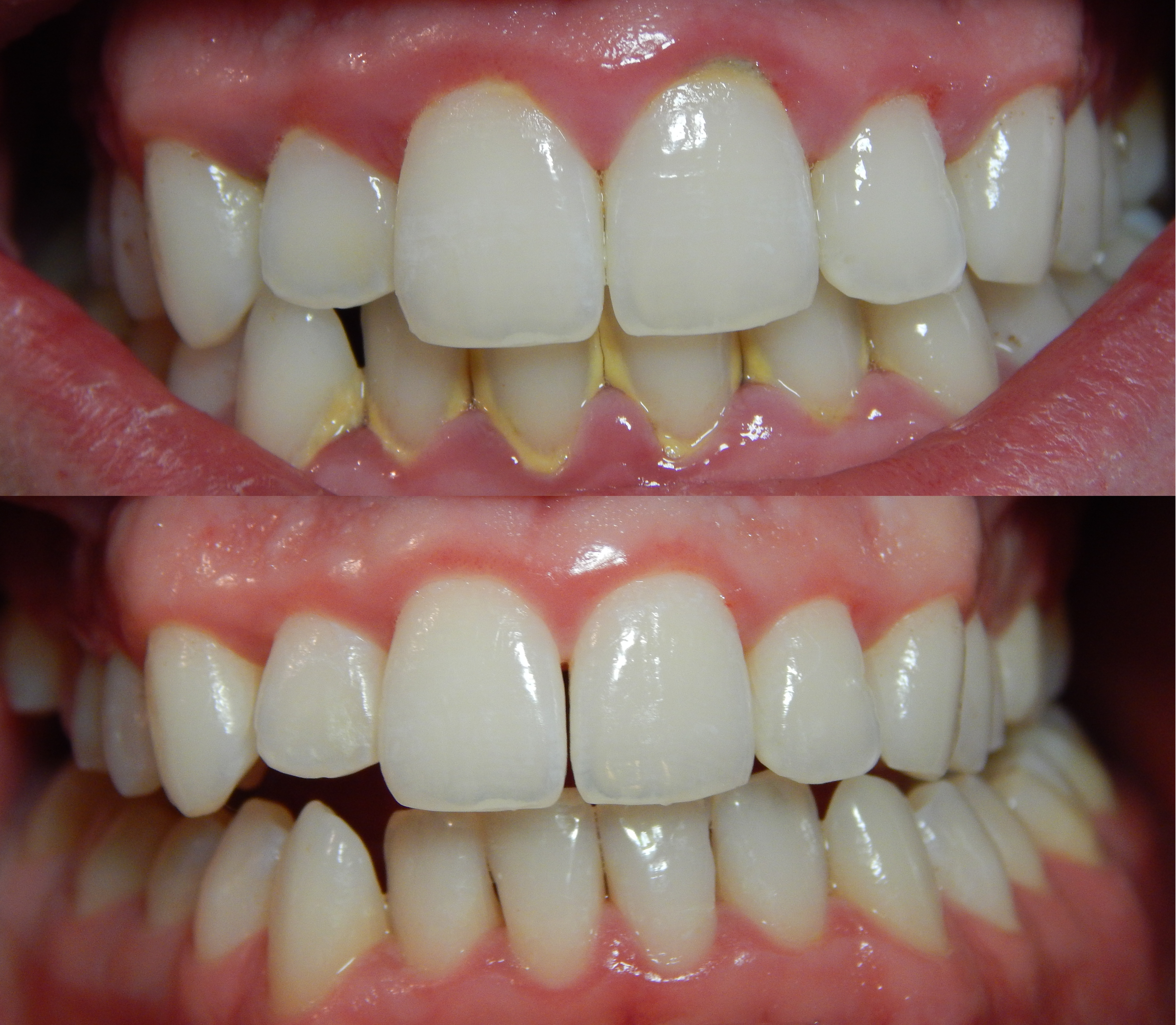
- Teeth before (top) and after (bottom) a thorough mechanical debridement
- ICD-9-CM: 96.54

In dentistry, debridement refers to the removal by dental cleaning of accumulations of plaque and calculus (tartar) in order to maintain dental health. Debridement may be performed using ultrasonic instruments, which fracture the calculus, thereby facilitating its removal, as well as hand tools, including periodontal scaler and curettes, or through the use of chemicals such as hydrogen peroxide.

== Description ==
Dental debridement is a procedure by which plaque and calculus (tartar) that have accumulated on the teeth is removed. Debridement may be performed in the process of personal or professional teeth cleaning. Professional debridement techniques include the use of ultrasonic instruments (which fracture the calculus, thereby facilitating its removal), as well as the use of hand tools, including periodontal scaler and curettes. Debridement may also be performed using saline solution.

== Procedures ==
Periodontal Pockets

Illustration of periodontal pocket on the right side of the tooth causing periodontal disease

A periodontal pocket is formed from a disease process; it is defined as the apical extension of the gingiva, resulting in detachment of the periodontal ligament (PDL). The PDL is a ligament that attaches the root of the tooth to the supporting alveolar bone. This ligament allows for occlusal force absorption. Plaque accumulates within the pocket initiating an inflammatory response due to an increased number of spirochetes. There are different types of bacteria that make up dental plaque. In cases of aggressive periodontitis three major species of bacteria have been identified within the periodontal pocket. These bacteria include Porphyromonas gingivalis, Prevotella intermedia, and Actinobacillus actinomycetemcomitans. Healthy gingiva consists of few microorganisms, mostly coccoid cells and straight rods. Diseased gingiva consists of increased numbers of spirochetes and mobile rods. Interactions between plaque and host inflammatory response determine the alterations in pocket depths. Bacterial plaque initiates a nonspecific host inflammatory response with the intention of eliminating necrotic cells and harmful bacteria. During this process cytokines, proteinases, and prostaglandins are produced which can cause damage, or kill healthy tissues such as macrophages, fibroblasts, neutrophils, and epithelial cells. The exposure to connective tissue and blood capillaries, allows microorganisms to gain an entryway to the circulation. This suppresses host protection mechanisms, leading to further destruction of bone.

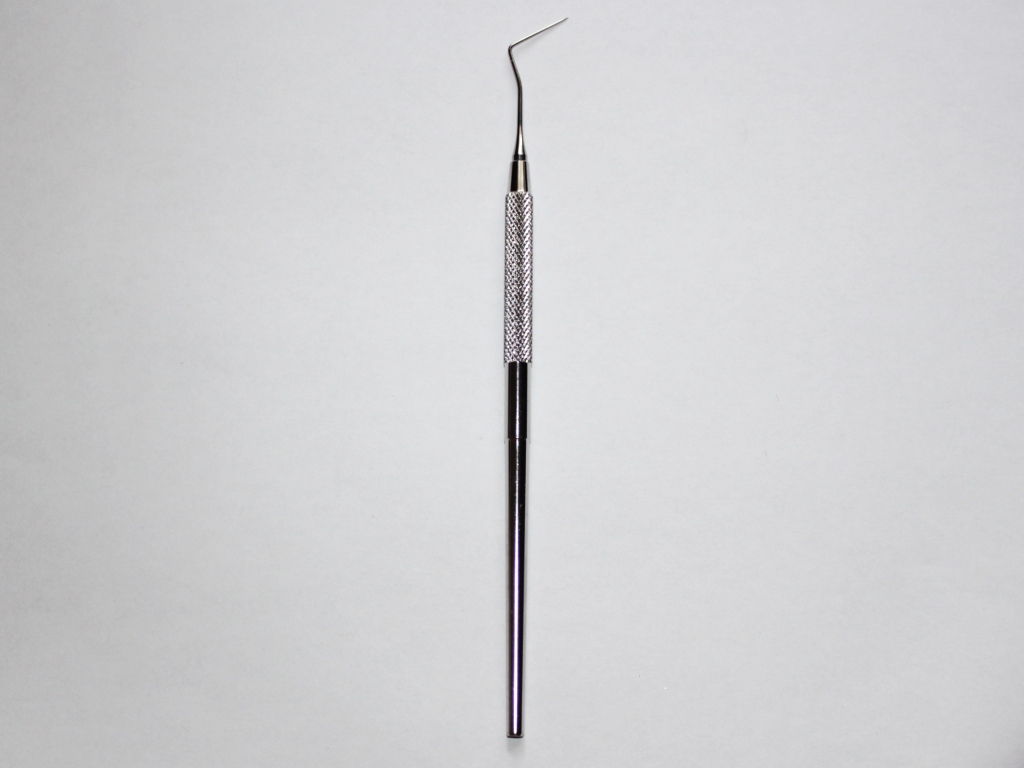
Periodontal probe

Periodontal pockets may occur from either coronal swelling or apical migration. Pockets that occur due to coronal swelling with no clinical attachment loss are considered pseudopockets. There are two types of periodontal pockets that are determined by the type of bone loss present. A suprabony pocket occurs when there is horizontal bone loss, the bottom of the pocket is coronal to the alveolar bone. An infrabony pocket occurs when there is vertical bone loss where the bottom of the pocket is apical to the alveolar bone.

Clinical signs of periodontal pockets include bluish-red, thickened gingiva, gingival bleeding, localized pain and in some cases exudate. Periodontal pockets can cause the loosening and loss of dentition due to destruction of supporting tissues including the alveolar bone, PDL and gingival tissue. Clinical diagnosis of periodontal pockets is achieved from full mouth periodontal probing performed by a dentist or dental hygienist.

Treatment of periodontal pocketing requires professional and at-home intervention. At home treatment for periodontal pockets include meticulous and routine plaque removal by brushing and interproximal cleaning. Professional treatment includes routine dental visits for debridement, scaling and root planing. Clinical treatment goals are set to control the inflammatory disease by removal of coronal and subgingival plaque containing destructive pathogens. With the consistent and complete removal of biofilm, the infection can be arrested and healthy periodontium can be achieved.

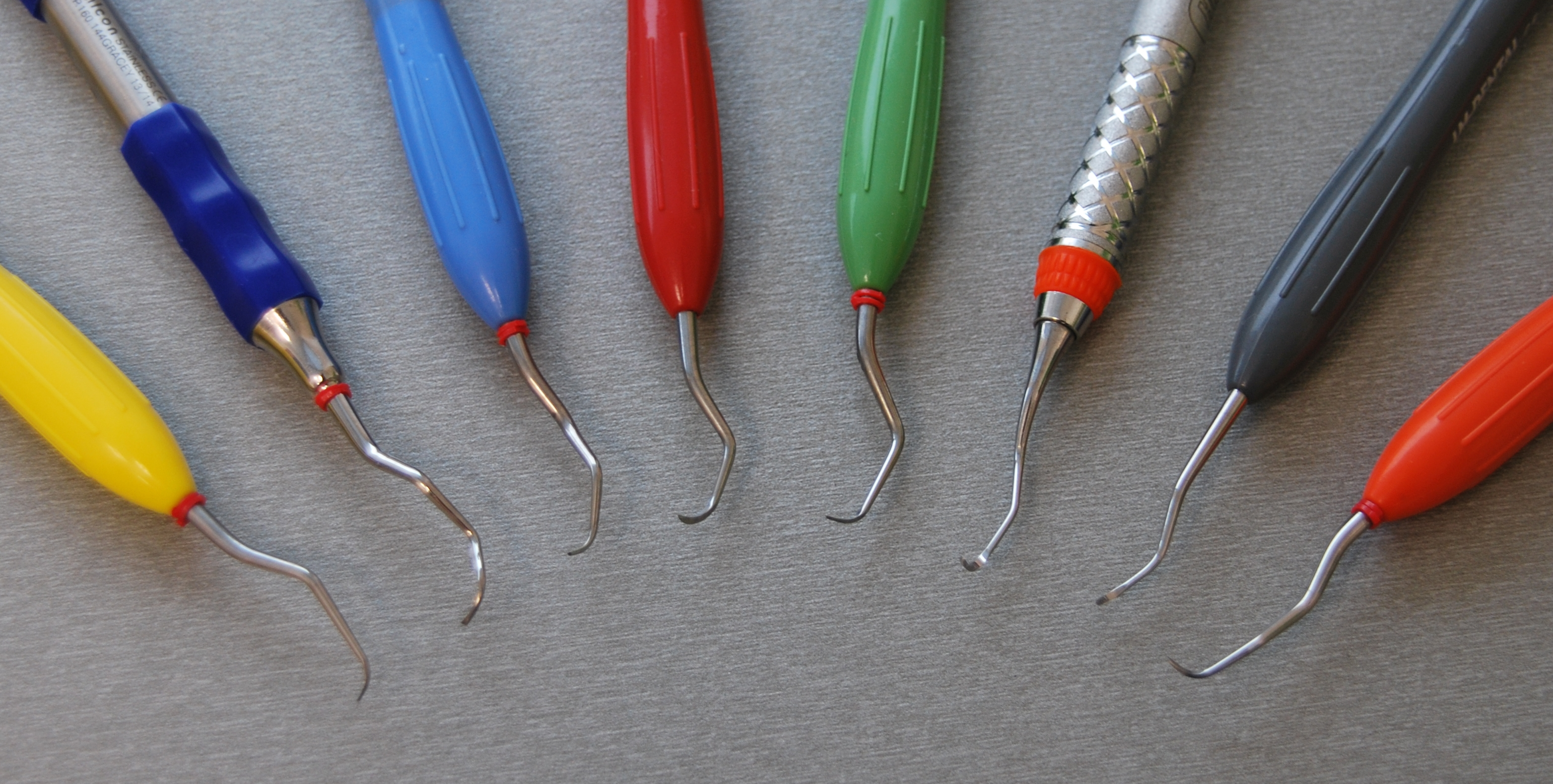
Curettes

Another major risk factor of a periodontal pocket is smoking as it affects the severity and prevalence of pockets. Tobacco cessation is a necessary intervention to motivate patients to quit smoking and achieve periodontal health. Smoking also delays the healing process once debridement, scaling, root planing and adequate home care has been completed.

Healing of periodontal pockets are shown by a reduction in pocket depth. Although pocket depths can be reduced by decreasing inflammation, large changes will not occur. Two ways in which periodontal pocket reduction can occur is by either non-surgical periodontal therapy (NSPT) or surgical periodontal therapy. NSPT includes but is not limited to initial debridement, scaling, root planing, antibiotic treatment, and oral health education. If periodontal pocket depths are not controlled and maintained with NSPT during a re-evaluation appointment then surgical periodontal therapy is necessary. Surgical periodontal therapy creates a stable and maintainable environment for the patient by eliminating pathological changes in the pockets. The overall purpose of surgical therapy is to eliminate the pathogenic plaque in pocket walls to get a stable and easily maintainable state. This can promote periodontal regeneration.

Periodontal Scalers

Professional periodontal therapy includes initial debridement, scaling and root planing with specific periodontal instruments. These instruments include files, curettes, after fives and mini fives used for mechanical debridement. The shank of periodontal instruments can either be rigid, which works better with heavy and tenacious calculus or flexible for fine tuning and light deposit.

Periodontal files are used to crush larger, tenacious deposits to prepare them for further debridement with a scaler, curette or ultrasonic scaler. They have a series of blades on a base, therefore they are not suitable for root planing and fine scaling. Universal curettes are double-ended instruments with paired mirror working ends and a rounded toe. These instruments can be used on all surfaces of the tooth including root surfaces in a periodontal pocket. Gracey curettes have a stronger, rigid shank and angulated working blades that are area specific. They are best for subgingival scaling and root planing because the offset blade allowing for greater adaptation. After fives are similar to gracey's except they have an extended shank to allow extension into deeper pockets (>5mm). They also have a thinner blade for heavy or tenacious calculus. Mini fives are a modification of after fives as their blades are half the length to allow for easier insertion and adaptation into deep pockets, furcations, developmental grooves and line angles. They also contribute to a reduction in tissue trauma. Ultrasonic scalers move in an elliptical motion and do not have a cutting edge. They operate at a frequency of 3,000–8,000 cycles per second and use magnetostrictive or piezo-electric technology, thus helping remove plaque and calculus while reducing operator wrist fatigue.

== See also ==
- Scaling and root planing
- Tooth cleaning
- Tooth polishing
- Oral hygiene
