= Prenatal dental care =

Care of the oral cavity during fetal development

Prenatal dental care is the care of the oral cavity during fetal development. The woman's body is subject to hormonal changes leading to several physical changes in the oral cavity during pregnancy. Some of these changes may cause tooth decay, erosion and periodontal health changes.

Proper dental care during pregnancy and recommended dental interventions are important to maintain health and well being of expecting mother and developing fetus. Dental treatment may be limited depending on gestational age and performed following gynecologist recommendations. Pharmacotherapy is very limited during pregnancy, due to potential negative effects during fetal development. The FDA has implemented strict guidelines to categorized prescribed drugs in order to regulate what is safe or unsafe during pregnancy.

== Dental interventions during pregnancy ==
There are suggestions that pregnant women should seek dental visits to avoid any adverse effects on the mother and fetus during the period of pregnancy, but there is no evidence to support this avoidance. Any dental treatment should be done with prior medical clearance of patient's gynecologist indicating treatment and drug limitations . Dental practitioners should keep the dental visit short, and minimally invasive. The use dental local anesthetics during pregnancy is safe; however, the type of vasoconstrictor and amount should be well regulated by the dentist. The safety of local anesthesia with a vasoconstrictor is questioned in patients having systemic conditions such as heart disease, untreated diabetes, hypertension, or hyperthyroidism.

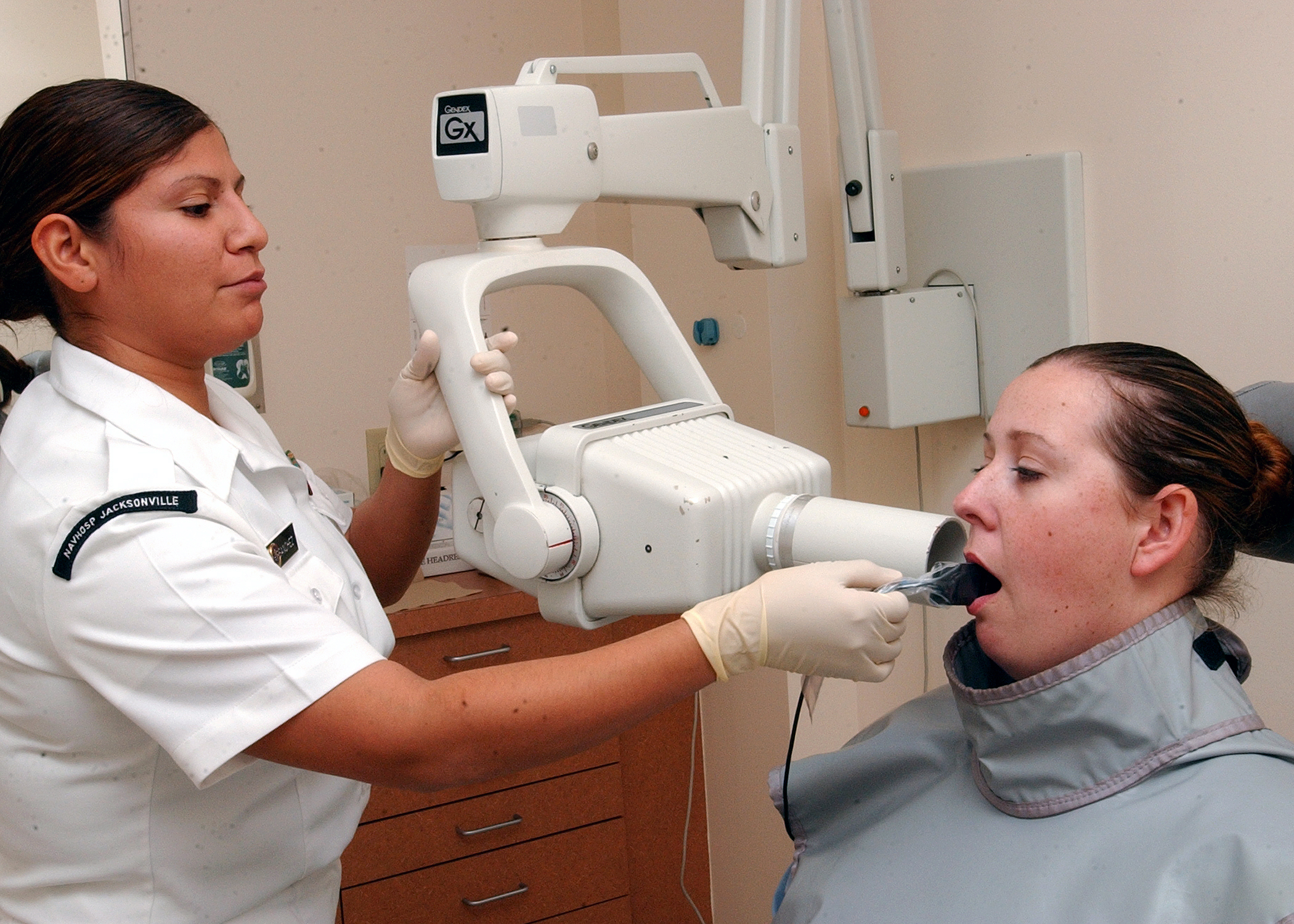

Blood pressure and cardiac output decrease in pregnant women, and therefore is important to avoid potential hypotensive syndrome during dental treatment. This could be as a result of positioning patient in the supine position on the dental chair. It is recommended that the patient should have the right hip elevated 10 to 12 cm by placing a cushion; meaning the patient's hip position should be higher than the foot level in the second and third trimesters to relieve the pressure on the inferior vena cava, and if necessary, the patient should be tilted 5% to 15% on her left side. If patient experiences fatigue, weakness and hypotension, a full left lateral position may be needed.

Dental interventions during pregnancy are limited depending on time of fetal development, following gynecologist clearance. During the first trimester there is a high risk of miscarriage and birth defects. Treatment should thus be limited to oral examinations, emergency procedures and cleaning. During the second trimester fetus is at low risk of birth defects; it is safe to perform limited to oral examinations, cleanings, restorative treatment, periodontal maintenance and minor maxillofacial surgical treatment. Lastly, during third trimester fetus is at a lower risk of birth defects; treatment is limited to oral examinations, cleanings and only emergency procedures.

Periodontal procedures such as scaling and root-planning can positively improve the quality of life in pregnant women; during this procedure microbial activity is decreased by removing plaque and calculus, and other irritants. Pyogenic granulomas or "pregnancy tumors," are commonly seen on the labial surface of the papilla in pregnant women. Lesions can be treated by local debridement or deep incision depending on their size, and by following adequate oral hygiene measures.

Pregnant women may undergo routine radiographic x-ray images strictly only if necessary during pregnancy. Radiographs should be done with the use of a lead apron and thyroid collar at all times to avoid potential risks to the mother and fetus.

== Endocrine effects on oral health during pregnancy ==
Hormonal changes during pregnancy have an effect on women's oral health during pregnancy. Good oral hygiene and seeking dental care during pregnancy is extremely important because an increase level of estrogen, human gonadotropin and progesterone; which can cause a variety of physiological changes in oral cavity. Additionally, there is an increase of thyroxine, steroids, and insulin.

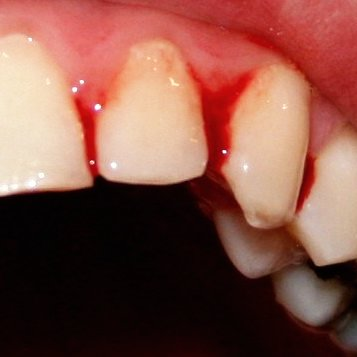
Pregnancy gingivitis is characterized of bleeding and swelling of gum tissue.

An increase of estrogen and progesterone levels makes pregnant women are more likely to develop pregnancy gingivitis. Pregnancy gingivitis is an inflammation of gum tissue due to an increase of blood flow to the gums. It is often characterized with soreness, sensitivity and bleeding of the gums. Pregnant women are often require more cleanings and prescription mouth rinses.

If gingivitis is not treated pregnant individuals can develop periodontitis. Periodontal disease is a chronic condition caused by a bacterial infection to gum tissue and supporting structures. If left untreated it can cause loosening of teeth, bad breath and irreversible bone loss.

Increase levels of progesterone and bacteria might cause some women to experience pyogenic granuloma or more commonly known pregnancy tumors. These are lumps of overgrown gum very close to the gum line or in between teeth. Tumors are non-cancerous and disappear after pregnancy.

Hormonal changes increase blood flow to gum tissue often resulting in gingival hyperplasia and gum bleeding while brushing and flossing.

During pregnancy women's calcium, phosphate and saliva pH values decrease, leading to an alteration the composition of saliva. As acidity of saliva increases, pregnant women are more prone to dental caries. Although teeth erosion and an increase of oral caries is not hormonal related, it is often experienced during pregnancy due to an increase intake of food and negative side effects vomiting due to morning sickness.

== Pharmacotherapy ==
The FDA categorized certain drugs according to their safety due to potential negative effects to fetus; these drugs are known to cause miscarriage and birth defects. They have been categorized in 5 categories and are prescribed following certain guidelines during pregnancy.

A - The drug has not shown an increased risk of fetal abnormalities when tested on pregnant women.

B - The drug was used in animal studies but revealed no evidence of harm to the fetus, but there are no adequate studies to prove this conclusion in pregnant women, or studies have shown an actual adverse effect on animals, but studies in pregnant women have failed to demonstrate a risk to the fetus.

C - studies have shown an adverse effect but no studies to determine these effects in pregnant women.

D - The drug causes a risk to the fetus, but the benefits of therapy may outweigh the potential risk.

X - the product is contraindicated because fetal abnormalities were seen.

== Research & evidence ==
There have been suggestions that severe periodontitis and tooth caries may increase the risk of having preterm birth and low birth weight, however, systemic reviews found insufficient evidence to determine if periodontitis or tooth decay can develop adverse birth outcomes.
