= Scaling and root planing =

Dental procedure

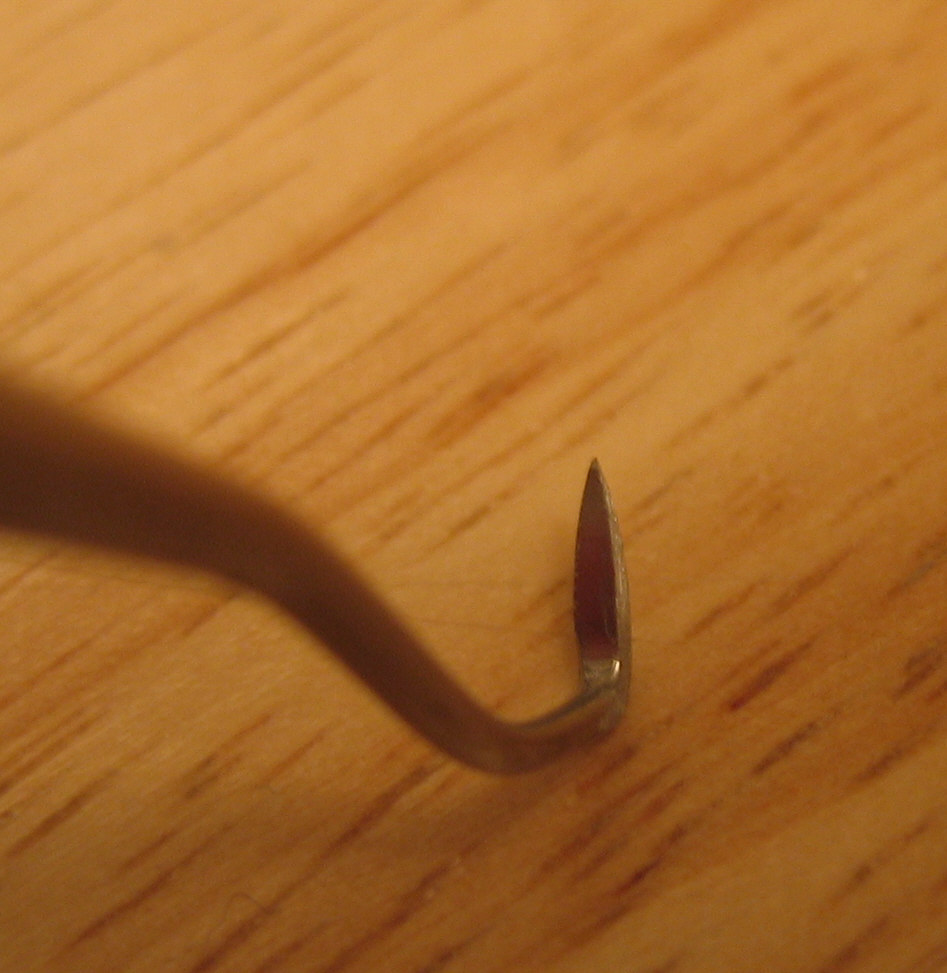
- Close-up image of a hand scaler
- ICD-9-CM: 96.54
- MeSH: D012534

Scaling and root planing, also known as conventional periodontal therapy, non-surgical periodontal therapy or deep cleaning, is a procedure involving removal of dental plaque and calculus (scaling or debridement) and then smoothing, or planing, of the (exposed) surfaces of the roots, removing cementum or dentine that is impregnated with calculus, toxins, or microorganisms, the agents that cause inflammation. It is a part of non-surgical periodontal therapy. This helps to establish a periodontium that is in remission of periodontal disease. Periodontal scalers and periodontal curettes are some of the tools involved.

A regular, non-deep teeth cleaning includes tooth scaling, tooth polishing, and debridement if too much tartar has accumulated, but does not include root planing.

== Plaque ==
Plaque is a soft yellow-grayish substance that adheres to the tooth surfaces including removable and fixed restorations. It is an organised biofilm that is primarily composed of bacteria in a matrix of glycoproteins and extracellular polysaccharides. This matrix makes it impossible to remove the plaque by rinsing or using sprays. Materia alba is similar to plaque but it lacks the organized structure of plaque and hence easily displaced with rinses and sprays.

Although everyone has a tendency to develop plaque and materia alba, through regular brushing and flossing these organized colonies of bacteria are disturbed and eliminated from the oral cavity. In general, the more effective one's brushing, flossing, and other oral homecare practices, the less plaque will accumulate on the teeth.

However, if, after 24 hours in the oral environment, biofilm remains undisturbed by brushing or flossing, it begins to absorb the mineral content of saliva. Through this absorption of calcium and phosphorus from the saliva, oral biofilm is transformed from the soft, easily removable form into a hard substance known as calculus. Commonly known as 'tartar', calculus provides a base for new layers of plaque biofilm to settle on and builds up over time. Calculus cannot be removed by brushing or flossing.

== Plaque build up and bone loss ==
Plaque accumulation tends to be thickest along the gumline. Because of the proximity of this area to the gum tissue, the bacterial plaque begins to irritate and infect the gums. This infection of the gum causes the gum disease known as gingivitis, which literally means inflammation of the gingiva, or gums. Gingivitis is characterized by swelling, redness and bleeding gums. It is the first step in the decline of periodontal health, and the only step which can be fully reversed to restore one's oral health.

As the gingival tissue swells, it no longer provides an effective seal between the tooth and the outside environment. Vertical space is created between the tooth and the gum, allowing new bacterial plaque biofilm to begin to migrate into the sulcus, or space between the gum and the tooth. In healthy individuals, the sulcus is no more than 3 mm deep when measured with a periodontal probe. As the gingivitis stage continues, the capillaries within the sulcus begin to dilate, resulting in more bleeding when brushing, flossing, or at dental appointments. This is the body's attempt to clear the infection from the tissues. Thus, bleeding is generally accepted as a sign of active oral infection. The swelling of the tissue may also result in deeper reading on periodontal probing, up to 4 mm. At a depth of 4 mm or greater, the vertical space between the tooth and surrounding gum becomes known as a periodontal pocket. Because tooth brush and floss cannot reach the bottom of a gum pocket 4–5 mm deep, bacteria stagnate in these sites and have the opportunity to proliferate into periodontal disease-causing colonies.

Once bacterial plaque has infiltrated the pocket, the transformation from biofilm into calculus continues. This results in an ulceration in the lining of the tissue, which begins to break down the attachment of the gum to the tooth. Gingival attachment begins to loosen further as the bacterial plaque continues to invade the space created by the swelling it causes. This plaque eventually transforms into calculus, and the process continues, resulting in deposits under the gum, and an increase in pocket depth. As the depth of the vertical space between the tooth and the gum reaches 5mm, a change occurs. The bacterial morphology, or make up, of the biofilm changes from the gram positive aerobic bacteria found in biofilm located supragingivally, or above the gumline. Replacing these gram positive bacteria of the general oral flora are obligate anaerobic gram negative bacteria. These bacteria are more destructive in nature than their aerobic cousins. The cell walls of gram negative bacteria contain endotoxins, which allow these organisms to destroy gingival tissue and bone more quickly. Periodontitis officially begins when these bacteria begin to act, resulting in bone loss. This bone loss marks the transition of gingivitis to true periodontal disease. In other words, the term periodontal disease may be synonymous with bone loss.

The first evidence of periodontal disease damage becomes apparent in radiographs as the crestal bone of the jaw begins to become blunted, slanted, or scooped out in appearance. This destruction occurs as a result of the effect of bacterial endotoxins on bone tissue. Because the bone is alive, it contains cells in it that build bone, known as osteoblasts, and cells that break down bone, called osteoclasts. Usually these work at the same speed and keep each other in balance. In periodontitis, however, the chemical mediators, or by-products, of chronic inflammation stimulate the osteoclasts, causing them to work more rapidly than the cells that build bone. The net result is that bone is lost, and the loss of bone and attachment tissues is called periodontal disease.

These processes will persist, causing greater damage, until the infectious bacterial agents (plaque) and local irritating factors (calculus) are removed. In order to effectively remove these at this stage in the disease process, brushing and flossing are no longer sufficient. This is due to several factors, the most important being the depth of the periodontal pocket. Brushing and flossing are effective only at removing the soft materia alba and biofilm in supragingival areas, and in pockets up to 3 mm deep. Even the best brushing and flossing is ineffective at cleaning pockets of greater depths, and are never effective in removing calculus. Therefore, in order to remove the causative factors that lead to periodontal disease, pocket depth scaling and root planing procedures are often recommended.

Once the bacteria and calculus are removed from the periodontal pocket, the tissue can begin to heal. The inflammation dissipates as the infection declines, allowing the swelling to decrease which results in the gums once again forming an effective seal between the root of the tooth and the outside environment. However, the damage caused by periodontal disease never heals completely. Bone loss due to the disease process is irreversible. The gingival tissue of the gums also tends to suffer permanent effects once the disease reaches a certain point. Because gum tissue requires bone to support it, if bone loss has been extensive, a patient will have permanent recession of the gums, and therefore exposure of the roots of the teeth in involved areas. If the bone loss is extensive enough, the teeth may begin to become mobile, or loose, and without intervention to arrest the disease process, will be lost.

Contrary to old beliefs, it is not a normal part of aging to lose teeth. Rather, it is periodontal disease that is the main cause of tooth loss in the adult population.

== Periodontal intervention ==
Treatment of periodontitis may include several steps, the first of which often requires the removal of the local causative factors in order to create a biologically compatible environment between the tooth and the surrounding periodontal tissues, the gums and underlying bone. Left untreated, chronic inflammation of the gums and supporting tissue can raise a person's risk of heart disease.

Prior to beginning these procedures, the patient is generally numbed in the area intended for instrumentation. Because of the deeper nature of periodontal scaling and root planing, either one half or one quarter of the mouth is generally cleaned during one appointment. This allows the patient to be entirely numbed in the necessary area during treatment. It is usually not recommended to have the entire mouth scaled at one appointment because of the potential inconveniences and complications of numbing the entire mouth – i.e., inability to eat or drink, likelihood of self injury by biting, etc.

Generally, the first step is the removal of dental plaque, the microbial biofilm, from the tooth, a procedure called scaling. Root planing involves smoothing the tooth's root. These procedures may be referred to as scaling and root planing, periodontal cleaning, or deep cleaning. These names all refer to the same procedure. The term "deep cleaning" originates from the fact that pockets in patients with periodontal disease are literally deeper than those found in individuals with healthy periodontia. Such scaling and root planing may be performed using a number of dental tools, including ultrasonic instruments and hand instruments, such as periodontal scalers and curettes.

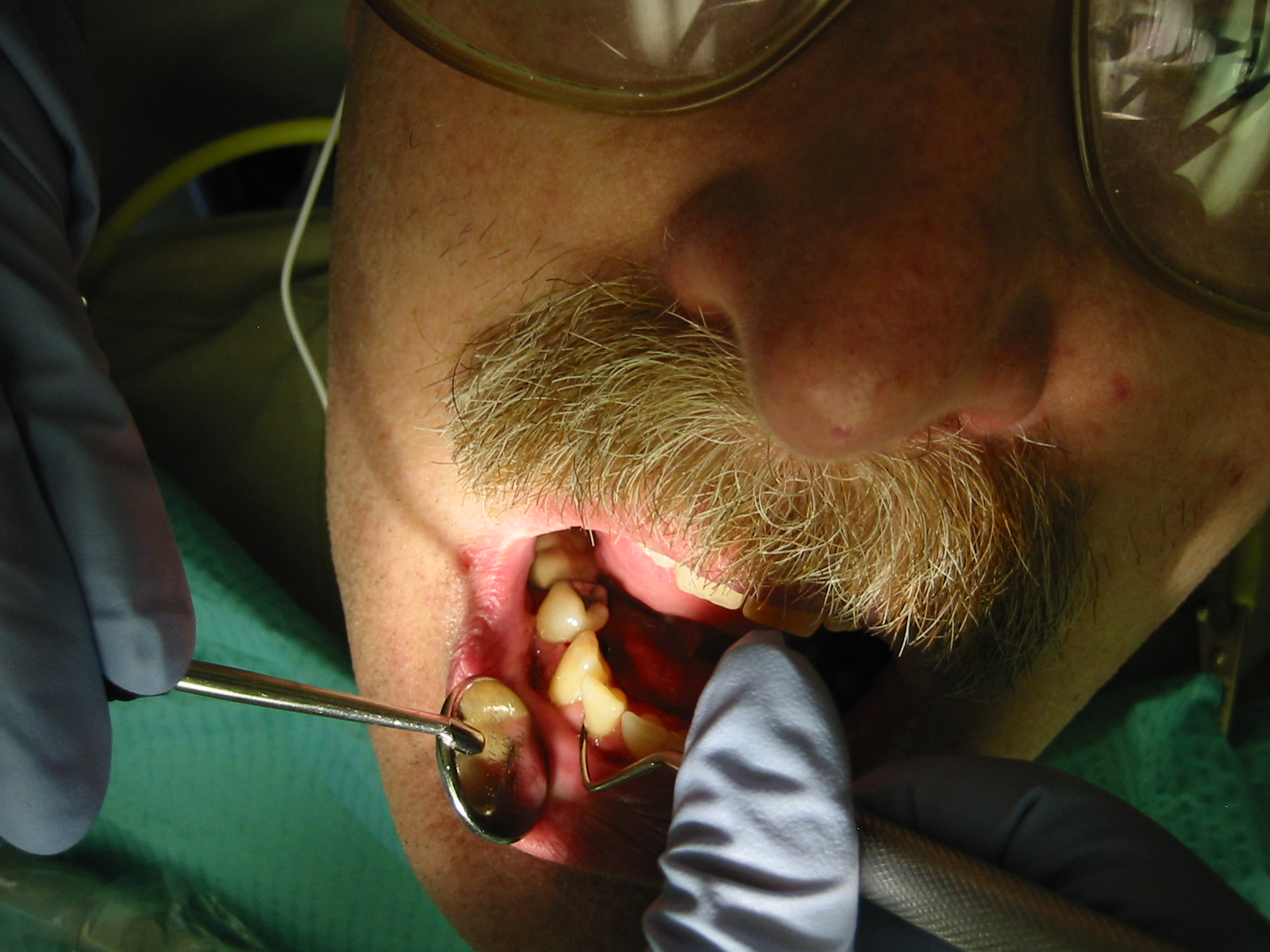
A dental hygienist demonstrates scaling

The objective for periodontal scaling and root planing is to remove dental plaque and calculus (tartar), which house bacteria that release toxins which cause inflammation to the gum tissue and surrounding bone. Planing often removes some of the cementum or dentine from the tooth.

Removal of adherent plaque and calculus with hand instruments can also be performed prophylactically on patients without periodontal disease. A prophylaxis refers to scaling and polishing of the teeth in order to prevent oral diseases. Polishing does not remove calculus, but only some plaque and stains, and should therefore be done only in conjunction with scaling.

Often, an electric device, known as an ultrasonic scaler, sonic scaler, or power scaler may be used during scaling and root planing. Ultrasonic scalers vibrate at a high frequency to help with removing stain, plaque and calculus. In addition, ultrasonic scalers create tiny air bubbles through a process known as cavitation. These bubbles serve an important function for periodontal cleanings. Since the bacteria living in periodontically involved pockets are mainly obligate anaerobes, meaning unable to survive in the presence of oxygen, these bubbles help to destroy them. The oxygen helps to break down bacterial cell membranes and causes them to lyse, or burst.

Since it is of the utmost importance to remove the entirety of the deposit in each periodontal pocket, attention to detail during this procedure is crucial. Therefore, depending on the depth of the pocket and amount of calculus deposit versus soft biofilm deposit, hand instruments may be used to complete the fine hand scaling that removes anything the ultrasonic scaler left behind. Alternatively, power scalers may be used following hand scaling in order to dispel deposits that have been removed from the tooth or root structure, but remain within the periodontal pocket.

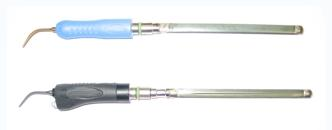
Two ultrasonic instruments

Sonic and ultrasonic scalers are powered by a system that causes the tip to vibrate. Sonic scalers are powered by an air-driven turbine. Ultrasonic scalers use either magnetostrictive or piezoelectric systems to create vibration. Magnetostrictive scalers use a stack of metal plates bonded to the tool tip. The stack is induced to vibrate by an external coil connected to an alternating current source. Ultrasonic scalers also include a liquid output or lavage, which aids in cooling the tool during use, as well as rinsing all the unwanted materials from the teeth and gum line. The lavage can also be used to deliver antimicrobial agents.

Although the final result of ultrasonic scalers can be produced by using hand scalers, ultrasonic scalers are sometimes faster and less irritating to the patient. Ultrasonic scalers create aerosols which can spread pathogens when a client carries an infectious disease. Research differs on whether there is a difference in effectiveness between ultrasonic scalers and hand instruments. Of particular importance to hygienists themselves is that the use of an ultrasonic scaler may reduce the risk of repetitive stress injury, because ultrasonic scalers require less pressure and repetition compared to hand scalers.

A new addition to the tools used to treat periodontal disease is the dental laser. Lasers of differing strengths are used for many procedures in modern dentistry, including fillings. In a periodontal setting, a laser may be used following scaling and root planing in order to promote healing of the tissues.

=== After scaling ===
Following scaling, additional steps may be taken to disinfect the periodontal tissues. Oral irrigation of the periodontal tissues may be done using chlorhexidine gluconate solution, which has high substantivity in the oral tissues. This means that unlike other mouthwashes, whose benefits end upon expectorating, the active antibacterial ingredients in chlorhexidine gluconate infiltrate the tissue and remain active for a period of time. However effective, chlorhexidine gluconate is not meant for long-term use. A recent European study suggests a link between the long-term use of the mouthrinse and high blood pressure, which may lead to a higher incidence of cardiovascular events. In the United States, it is available only through a doctor's prescription, and in small, infrequent doses it has been shown to aid in tissue healing after surgery. Current research indicates the irrigation of CHX after SC/RP may inhibit the re-attachment of periodontal tissues. Specifically preventing the formation of fibroblasts. An alternate irrigation with povidone-iodine may be used – if no contra-indications exist.

Site specific antibiotics may also be placed in the periodontal pocket following scaling and root planing in order to provide additional healing of infected tissues. Unlike antibiotics which are taken orally to achieve a systemic effect, site specific antibiotics are placed specifically in the area of infection. These antibiotics are placed directly into the periodontal pockets and release slowly over a period of time. This allows the medication to seep into the tissues and destroy bacteria that may be living within the gingiva, providing even further disinfection and facilitation of healing. Certain site specific antibiotics provide not only this benefit, but also reduce pocket depth. Arestin, a site specific brand of the antibiotic minocycline, is claimed to enable regaining of at least 1 mm of gingival reattachment height.

In cases of severe periodontitis, scaling and root planing may be considered the initial therapy prior to future surgical needs. Additional procedures such as bone grafting, tissue grafting, and/or gingival flap surgery done by a periodontist (a dentist who specializes in periodontal treatment) may be necessary for severe cases or for patients with refractory (recurrent) periodontitis.

Patients who present with severe or necrotizing periodontal disease may have further steps involved in their treatment. These patients often have genetic or systemic factors that contribute to the development and severity of their periodontitis. Common examples include diabetes type I and type II, a family history of periodontal disease, and immunocompromised individuals. For such patients, the practitioner may take a sample from the pockets to allow for culture and more specific identification and treatment of the causative organism. Intervention may also include discontinuation of medication that contributes to the patient's vulnerability or referral to a physician to address an existing but previously untreated condition if it plays a role in the periodontal disease process.

=== Full mouth treatment ===
The "traditional" debridement procedure involves four sessions spaced two weeks apart, doing one quadrant (one quarter of the mouth) each session. In 1995 a group in Leuven proposed doing the whole mouth in about 24 hours (two sessions). When done using ultrasonic instruments this is called full mouth ultrasonic debridement (FMUD). The rationale for full mouth debridement is that quadrants that have been cleaned will not be reinfected with bacteria from quadrants that have not yet been cleaned. Other advantages of full mouth ultrasonic debridement include speed/reduced treatment time, and reduced need for anaesthesia, with equivalent results to scaling and planing. One study found that the average time to treat each pocket with full-mouth ultrasonic debridement was 3.3 minutes, whereas it took 8.8 minutes per pocket for quadrant scaling and root planing (SRP). Differences in improvement were not statistically significant. Studies by the Leuven group, using somewhat different protocols, found that the one-stage treatment (i.e. in 24 hours) gave better results than the quadrant-by-quadrant approach (taking six weeks). They also had the patients use chlorhexidine for two months after the treatment.

=== Depth of planing ===
Another question in dental cleaning is how much cementum or dentine should be removed from the roots. Bacterial contamination of root surfaces is limited in depth, so extensive planing away of cementum – as advocated by traditional scaling and root planing – is not necessary to allow periodontal healing and the formation of new attachment. In contrast to traditional scaling and root planing, the aim of some FMUD procedures is to disturb the bacterial biofilm within the periodontal pocket, without removing cementum. Typically, root planing will require the use of hand instruments such as specialized dental curettes instead of the scaler tips used in FMUD to debride the root surface and periodontal pocket.

== Evidence-based dentistry ==
Several systematic reviews have been made of the effectiveness of scaling and root planing as evidence-based dentistry. A Cochrane review updated in 2018, considered only scaling and polishing of the teeth, but not root planing. After examining two studies with 1711 participants, they concluded that routine scale and polish treatment for adults without severe periodontitis makes little to no difference for gingivitis, probing depths or oral health quality of life when compared to no scheduled care. Oral hygiene instruction was found to help as well. Another inconclusive review of scaling and polishing (without planing) was published by the British Dental Association in 2015.

An extensive review that did involve root planing was published by the Canadian Agency for Drugs and Technologies in Health in 2016. It made a number of findings, including (1) In five randomized controlled trials, scaling and root planing "was associated with a decrease in plaque from baseline at one month, three months, or six months;" and (2) Four studies analyzed changes in the gingival index (GI) from the baseline and "found a significant improvement from baseline in the scaling and root planing group at three months and six months." This study also discussed evidence-based guidelines for frequency of scaling with and without root planing for patients both with and without chronic periodontitis. The group that produced one of the main systematic reviews used in the 2016 Canadian review has published guidelines based on its findings. They recommend that scaling and root planing (SRP) should be considered as the initial treatment for patients with chronic periodontitis. They note that "the strength of the recommendation is limited because SRP is considered the reference standard and thus used as an active control for periodontal trials and there are few studies in which investigators compare SRP with no treatment." They add however that "root planing ... carries the risk of damaging the root surface and potentially causing tooth or root sensitivity. Generally expected post-SRP procedural adverse effects include discomfort."

Enamel cracks, early caries and resin restorations can be damaged during scaling. A study conducted in 2018 recommended that teeth condition and restorations should be identified before undergoing the ultrasonic scaling procedures.

== Effectiveness of the procedure ==
A scaling and root planing procedure is to be considered effective if the patient is subsequently able to maintain their periodontal health without further bone or attachment loss and if it prevents recurrent infection with periodontal pathogens.

The long term effectiveness of scaling and root planing depends upon a number of factors. These factors include patient compliance, disease progress at the time of intervention, probing depth, and anatomical factors like grooves in the roots of teeth, concavities, and furcation involvement which may limit visibility of underlying deep calculus and debris.

First and foremost, periodontal scaling and root planing is a procedure that must be done thoroughly and with attention to detail in order to ensure complete removal of all calculus and plaque from involved sites. If these causative agents are not removed, the disease will continue to progress and further damage will result. In cases of mild to moderate periodontitis, scaling and root planing can achieve excellent results if the procedure is thorough. As periodontitis increases in severity, a greater amount of supporting bone is destroyed by the infection. This is illustrated clinically by the deepening of the periodontal pockets targeted for cleaning and disinfection during the procedure. Once the periodontal pockets exceed 6 mm in depth, the effectiveness of deposit removal begins to decrease, and the likelihood of complete healing after one procedure begins to decline as well. The more severe the infection prior to intervention, the greater the effort required to arrest its progress and return the patient to health. Diseased pockets over 6 mm can be resolved through periodontal flap surgery, performed by a dental specialist known as a periodontist.

Although healing of the soft tissues will begin immediately following removal of the microbial biofilm and calculus that cause the disease, scaling and root planing is only the first step in arresting the disease process. Following initial cleaning and disinfection of all affected sites, it is necessary to prevent the infection from recurring. Therefore, patient compliance is by far the most important factor having the greatest influence on the success or failure of periodontal intervention. Immediately following treatment, the patient will need to maintain excellent oral care at home. With proper homecare, which includes but is not limited to brushing twice daily for 2–3 minutes, flossing daily and use of mouthrinse, the potential for effective healing following scaling and root planing increases. Commitment to and diligence in the thorough completion of daily oral hygiene practices are essential to this success. If the patient fails to change the factors that allowed the disease to set in – for example, not flossing or brushing only once a day – the infection will likely recur.

The process which allows for the formation of deep periodontal pockets does not occur overnight. Therefore, it is unrealistic to expect the tissue to heal completely in a similarly short time period. Gains in gingival attachment may occur slowly over time, and ongoing periodontal maintenance visits are usually recommended every three to four months to sustain health. The frequency of these later appointments is key to maintaining the results of the initial scaling and root planing, especially in the first year immediately following treatment.

Since the patient may still have pockets that surpass the effective cleaning ability of a brush or floss, for long-term success of their treatment they should return every 90 days in order to ensure that those pockets remain free of deposit. Patients should be counseled that 90 days is not an arbitrary interval; at 90 days, the healing made possible by the scaling and root planing will be complete. This will allow the practitioner to re-measure pocket depths to determine whether the intervention was successful. At this appointment, progress should be discussed, as well as any refractory periodontitis. At 90 days from the original scaling and root planing, the periodontal bacteria, if any remain, will have reached their full strength again. Therefore, if there are remaining areas of disease, the practitioner will clean them again, and may place more site-specific antibiotic. Furthermore, this appointment allows for the review of homecare, or necessary additions or education.

== See also ==
- Teeth cleaning
- Tooth polishing
- Debridement (dental)
- Periodontal disease
- Dental aerosol
