= Tooth polishing =

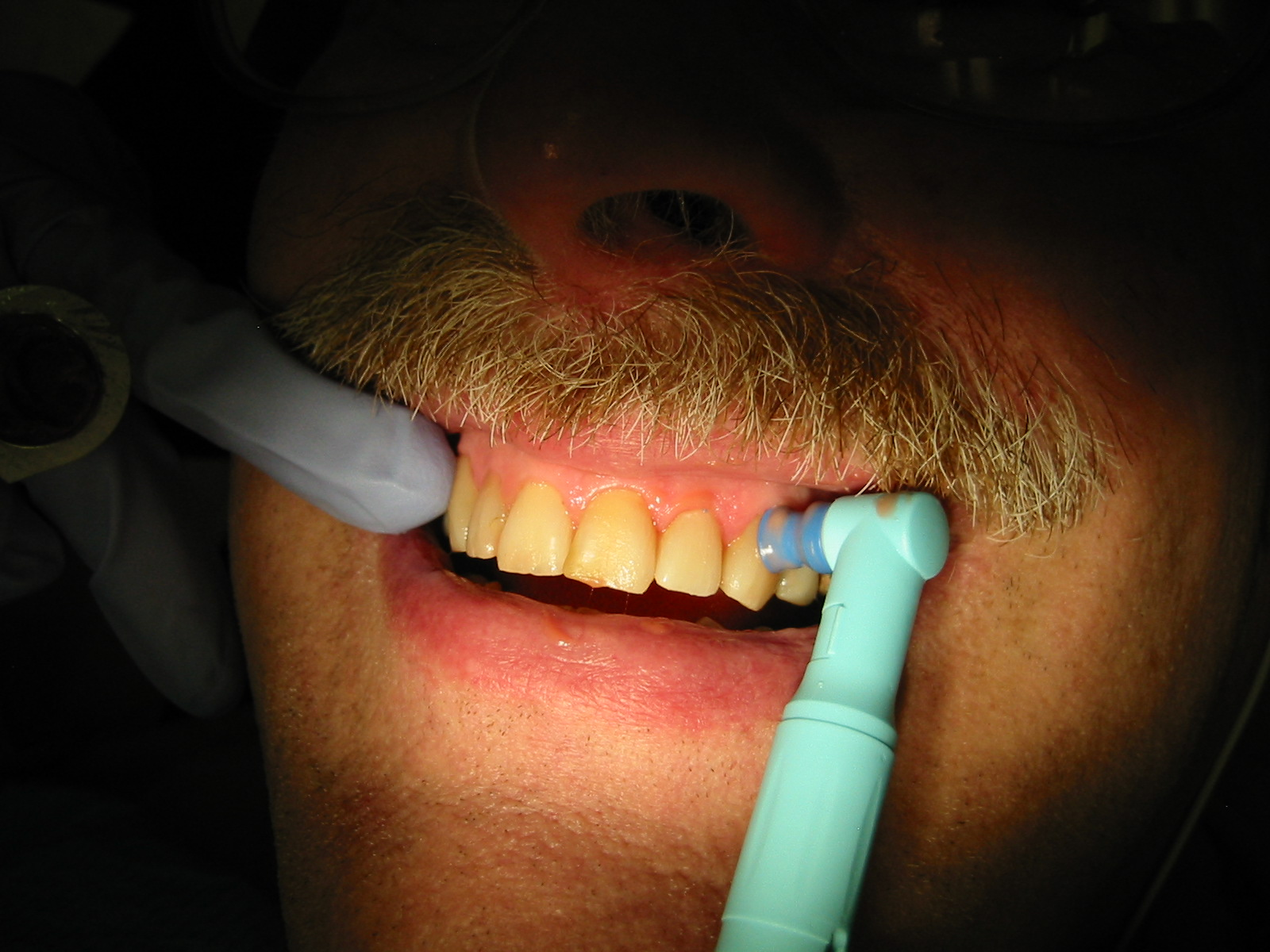
- Polishing a tooth using a prophy cup.
- Specialty: Dentistry
- ICD-9-CM: 96.54
- MeSH: D003775

Tooth polishing procedures are done to smooth the surfaces of teeth and restorations. The purpose of polishing is to remove extrinsic stains, remove dental plaque accumulation, increase aesthetics and to reduce corrosion of metallic restorations. Tooth polishing has little therapeutic value and is usually done as a cosmetic procedure after debridement and before fluoride application. Common practice is to use a prophy cup—a small motorized rubber cup—along with an abrasive polishing compound.

== History ==
There is evidence of tooth polishing dating back to Roman and Greek times. However, Pierre Fauchard, the father of modern dentistry, is credited for the introduction of tooth polishing to remove dental stains. Early polishing pastes consisted of finely ground coral, egg shells, ginger or salt. Within the last century, Alfred Fones, the founder of dental hygiene, began educating students on coronal tooth polishing. Prior to the 1970s tooth polishing was provided to all patients as part of their complete care. As of the 1990s to 2000s, evidence suggests that full mouth polishing is not always necessary. Full mouth polishing is still widely practiced but selective polishing is recommended by many educational institutions.

== Equipment ==
=== Prophylactic paste (polishing paste) ===
Prophylactic paste contains abrasives that vary in size, shape, and hardness. Based on these variants, pastes are available in fine, medium, coarse and super-coarse grits. There are also various flavours of prophylactic paste available. Some prophylactic pastes contain fluoride to aid in the remineralization of the enamel surface and others help reduce dentinal sensitivity.

=== Rubber cup ===
Rubber cups, also called prophy cups, are used in the hand-piece. Polishing paste, prophylactic paste, usually containing fluoride, is used with the rubber cups for polishing. Rubber cups should not be used over the cementum area as it may remove a layer of cementum at the cervical area. There are two popular types of prophy cups: 4 webs and 6 webs. Risk of generating frictional heat, and increased abrasion to the tooth surface may result from increased contact time, increased speed of rotation, and increased pressure of the cup on the tooth. Short intermittent strokes should be used in order to avoid damage.

=== Bristle brush ===
Bristle brushes are used in the prophylaxis angle with a polishing paste. The use of the brush should be confined to the crown to avoid injury to the gingiva and cementum.

=== Prophy angle ===
Currently, the most commonly used tool for tooth polishing is prophy angle. It integrates a rubber cup into a high torque gear, which can be plugged into a low speed handpiece and drive rubber cup to polish teeth.

=== Dental tape ===
Dental tape is used for polishing the proximal surfaces of teeth that are inaccessible to other polishing instruments. It is also used with polishing paste. Particular care should be taken to avoid injury to the gingiva. The area should be cleaned with warm water to remove all remnants of the paste.

=== Air-powder polishing ===
Air-powder polishing is used with a specially designed handpiece. This device is called Prophy-jet. It delivers an air-powder slurry of warm water and sodium bicarbonate for polishing. It is very effective for the removal of extrinsic stains and soft deposits. There are several contraindications for air polishing. These include: sodium restricted diet, hypertension, respiratory illnesses, infectious diseases, chronic kidney disease, Addison's or Cushing's disease, and some medications (mineralocorticoid steroids, antidiuretics, potassium supplements).

=== Laser-assisted polishing ===
Laser-assisted tooth polishing is an emerging technique that utilizes laser technology to enhance the removal of plaque and stains from tooth surfaces, aiming to minimize enamel loss compared to traditional methods. A recent study indicated that Erbium:yttrium-aluminum-garnet (Er:YAG) laser treatment could create a smoother enamel surface compared to conventional polishing methods.

== Selective polishing ==
Current evidence suggest that prophylactic polishing is only necessary when extrinsic stain is present on the tooth surface. This suggests that tooth polishing should be based on the clients individual needs. Previously, tooth polishing was a service provided at every hygiene appointment, due to this many patients expect this as part of the routine care. This has placed dental professionals into an ethical dilemma on whether or not this service should be provided.

== Extrinsic stain ==
Many factors may lead to discoloration of the external layer of the tooth called the enamel. Foods and beverages such as coffee, tea, and red wine can stain the enamel. Chromogenic bacteria found in plaque that is left behind due to poor oral hygiene can also cause staining. Other external factors that can lead to extrinsic staining are smoking, some antimicrobial rinses, and environmental working conditions where there is exposure to metallic dust. In most circumstances this stain can be removed by prophylactic polishing.

== Adverse effects ==
=== Teeth ===
This outermost fluoride rich layer of enamel is removed when tooth polishing is provided. The mineral components of saliva and polishing pastes containing fluoride can assist in remineralizing this outer layer. The enamel surface is strong enough to withstand repeated tooth polishing, but it should be avoided on newly erupted teeth, exposed root surfaces and areas of demineralization. If polishing does occur on these surfaces, fluoride therapy can minimize the risk of dental caries. Excessive pressure can lead to frictional heat that may cause discomfort or necrosis of the dental pulp.

=== Restorations ===
Surfaces of restorations may be damaged by conventional tooth polishing with prophylactic paste. Materials such as gold, amalgam, composite, porcelain, and titanium implants can be polished by using specifically designed pastes such as those that contain rouge, tripoli, cuttle powder, emery, or coarse pumice to prevent roughened or scratched surfaces. It is important to refer to manufacturer's directions before using any product on dental restorations.

=== Soft tissues ===
Trauma to soft tissues may result from improper technique or prior inflammation of tissues. Particles within the prophylactic paste can go below the gumline and cause inflammation or delayed healing.

=== Environment ===
Aerosols are produced during tooth polishing and may transmit infectious diseases to other people in the dental office. This can become problematic because some microorganisms remain in the air for an extended period of time and can contaminate hard surfaces. Occupational injuries are also possible for the clinician due to improper technique, ergonomics and the weight of the handpiece.

== Precautions ==
There are a number of precautions that clinicians should be aware of when deciding if tooth polishing is indicated. Precautions include; teeth without existing stain, newly erupted teeth, tooth decalcification, hypo-calcification, hypoplasia, demineralization, rampant caries. Areas with exposed root surfaces should also be avoided as well as, areas with tooth sensitivity and gingival inflammation. Tooth polishing should also be avoided in the case of allergies and communicable diseases.

== See also ==
- Tooth scaling - Scaling is a process by which plaque and calculus are removed from both supragingival and subgingival tooth surface. No deliberate attempt is made to remove tooth substance along with the calculus.
- Root planing is the process by which residual embedded calculus and portions of cementum are removed from the roots to produce a smooth, hard, clean surface.
- Debridement (dental)
