= Periodontal scaler =

Dental tool

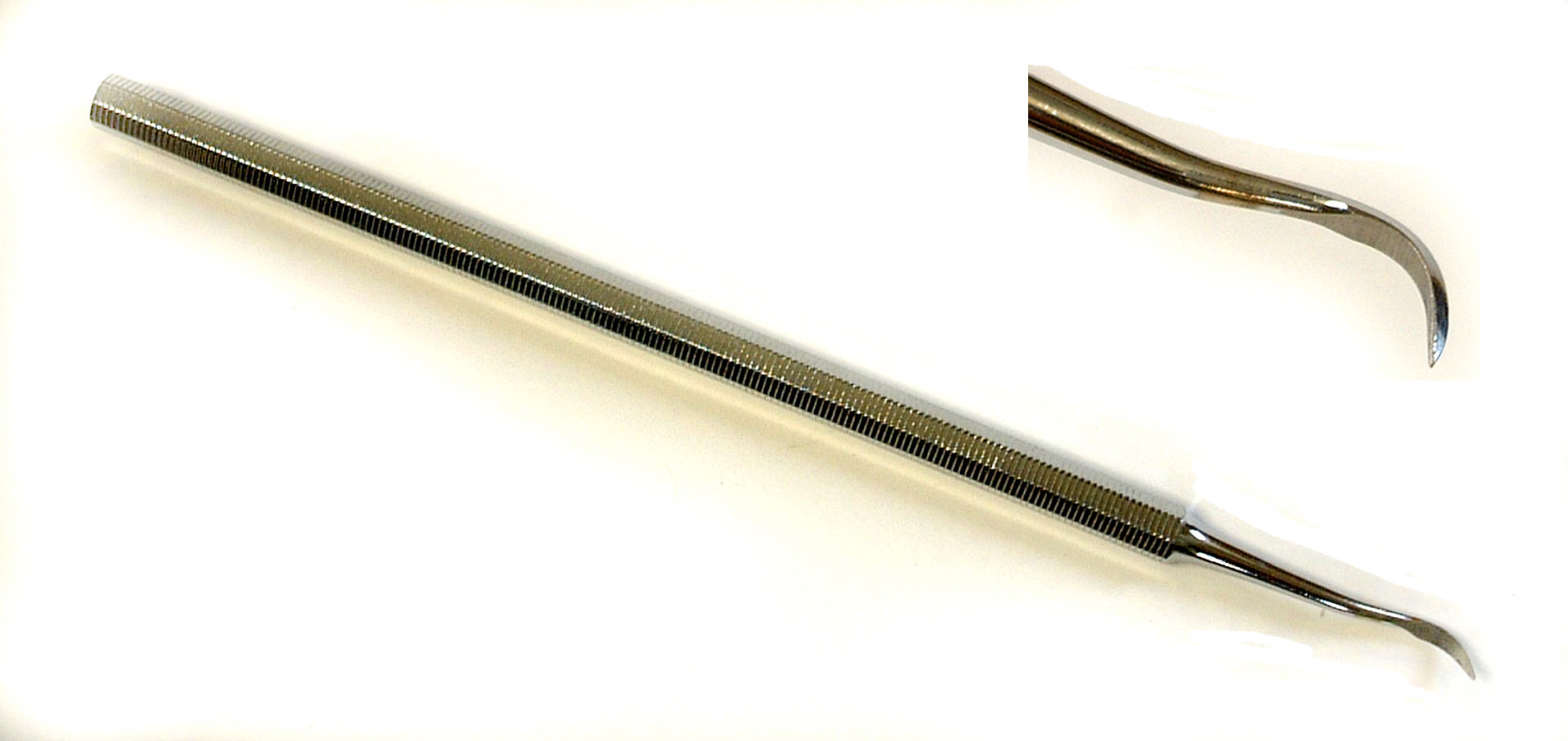
Periodontal scaler

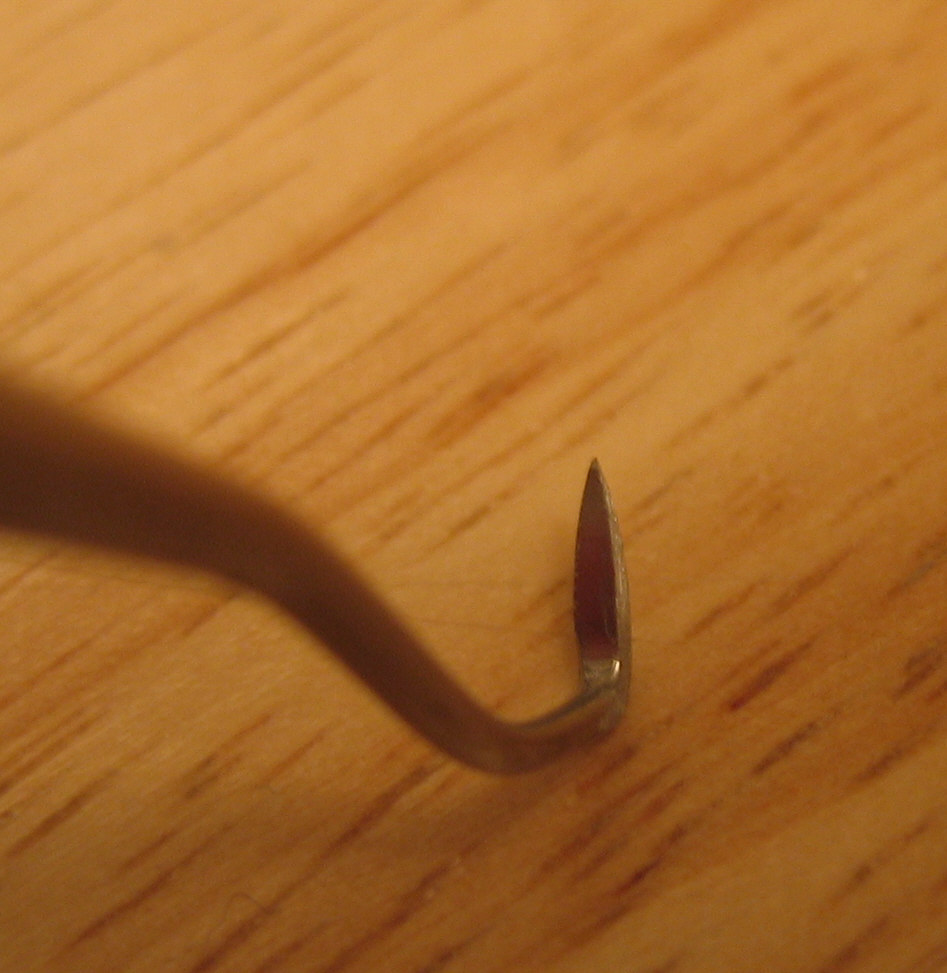
Periodontal scalers have sharp tips to access tight embrasure spaces between teeth and are triangular in cross-section.

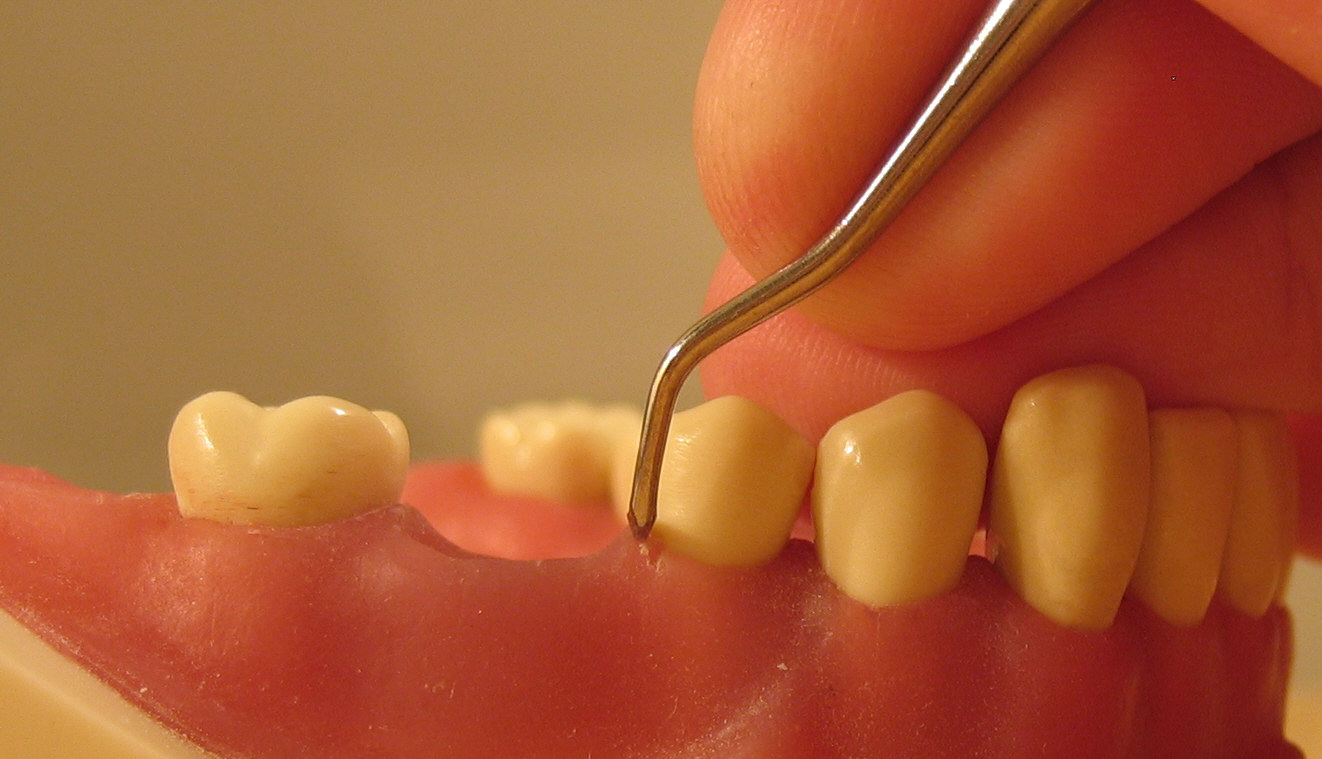
A posterior scaler shown in relation to a posterior tooth on a typodont.

Periodontal scalers are dental instruments used in the prophylactic and periodontal care of teeth (most often human teeth), including scaling and root planing. The working ends come in a variety of shapes and sizes, but they are always narrow at the tip, so as to allow for access to narrow embrasure spaces between teeth. They differ from periodontal curettes, which possess a blunt tip.

== Use ==
Together with periodontal curettes, periodontal scalers are used to remove calculus from teeth. While curettes are often universal in that they can be used on both supra- and sub-gingival calculus removals, scalers are restricted to supra-gingival use. Use of a scaler below the gum line is likely to damage the gingiva (gums).

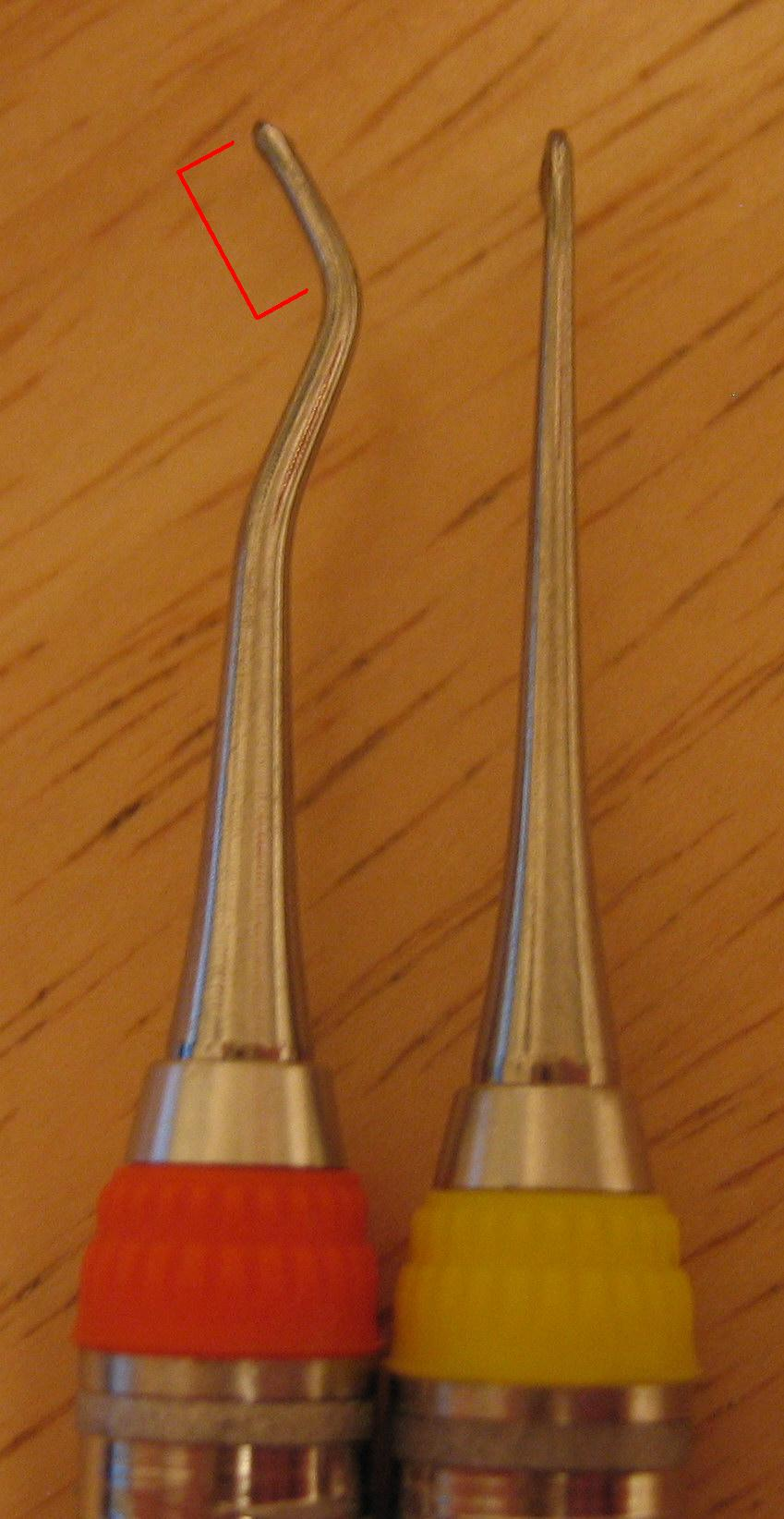
The anterior scaler (yellow ring) is straight, while the posterior scaler (orange ring) has an angled terminal shank (highlighted in red) to allow for easy access to the surfaces of posterior teeth.

Scalers have scraping edges on both sides of their blades and thus are fit for both mesial and distal surfaces of any tooth in the area in which they are being used.

Scalers are best used when their terminal shank, namely, the last portion of the functional shank closest to the working end, is angled slightly toward the surface of the tooth.

== Design and materials ==
The composition of hand instruments is continuously evolving, which is why it may be a challenge to find the proper instrument for the right clinical situation. With the broad variation of instrument designs and materials, it allows dental professionals to implement periodontal therapy with reduced strain and increased comfort levels for both the clinician and the patient. The following are some factors to consider with the design of periodontal scalers:

- Balance – when the working ends are aligned properly to the long axis of the instrument handle, finger pressure can be applied more effectively to reduce muscle fatigue on the clinician’s hands and/or forearm.
- Diameter – the handles with larger diameters allow the instrument to be held easier and reduces muscle stress of the clinician’s fingers.
- Texture – the texture of the instrument handle increases control, such as finger grip, and reduces hand fatigue.
- Weight – the handle’s hollowness allows the instrument to be more lightweight and increases the clinician's tactile sensitivity.

With the continuous, evolving technology of hand instruments, dental professionals are given the opportunity to implement dental treatment more effectively for the patient while improving their work surroundings simultaneously.

== Design characteristics ==
Generally, there are two cutting edges per working end: the outer cutting edge (farther from the instrument handle) and the inner cutting edge (closer to the instrument handle). This way, both edges can adapt to both the interproximal surfaces of any tooth, to which they are being used. Typically, periodontal scalers have pointed backs, but some new scaler designs have working ends with rounded backs as well. Additionally, they have triangular cross sections; this limits their instrumentation use to above the gingiva (supragingival) to prevent any tissue trauma. Periodontal scalers also have pointed tips and faces perpendicular to the lower shank; this is why the terminal shank must be tilted towards the tooth in order to establish correct angulation since the cutting edges are at equal levels with each other.

There are two types of periodontal scaler designs:

- Anterior sickle scalers are designed to be used on anterior teeth. Typically, they are constructed with one working-end and are categorized as single-ended instruments. As well, they may be combined to produce a double-ended instrument with two working ends on both sides.
- Posterior sickle scalers may be used on both anterior and posterior teeth. The working ends are designed to be opposite images of one another, therefore, two posterior sickle scalers are combined to produce a double-ended instrument.

== Techniques ==
When it comes to periodontal therapy, there are multiple steps that are required prior to activating a proper working stroke on the teeth. First, a modified pen grasp position must be achieved before starting periodontal instrumentation; this position involves the thumb and the index finger placed on the instrument handle, the middle finger resting on the shank, and the little finger neutral and relaxed near the ring finger. By holding periodontal instruments in this manner, it allows for precise control of the instrument, effective detection of rough areas on the tooth structure (i.e. calculus or irregular tooth anatomy), and reduces musculoskeletal stress on the clinician.

In addition, there are several characteristics of a calculus removal stroke that are vital to the effectiveness of periodontal instrumentation; these include stabilization, adaptation, angulation, lateral pressure, characteristics, stroke direction, and stroke number.

- Stabilization is the pressure applied to the handle with the index finger and the thumb while maintaining the fulcrum finger (ring finger) against the tooth surface.
- Adaptation requires placing the tip third (first 1-2 millimeters) of the lateral face of the working end, in contact with the tooth structure.
- Angulation is the relationship between the face of the instrument and the tooth surface, ideally 70º-80º when using periodontal scalers.
- Lateral pressure is typically moderate to firm, and the characteristics are short, controlled strokes. The stroke directions include vertical, oblique and horizontal strokes, all leading away from the soft tissue to avoid tissue trauma.
- Stroke number is limited to the minimum number of strokes necessary, and applied only when and where there is calculus present on a tooth surface.

Once all these characteristics are understood, the clinician will activate the periodontal debridement strokes using the periodontal scalers.

When performing periodontal debridement, the instrumentation of anterior teeth and posterior teeth are applied with the following steps. First, the fulcrum finger rests on a tooth to support the clinician’s hand, then at the initiation of a stroke, the clinician will press down on the fulcrum finger to further gain control. It is crucial to tilt the lower shank of the periodontal scaler slightly towards the tooth surface being worked on to obtain correct angulation. This ensures that a 70º-80º angulation is achieved between the tooth surface and the face of the instrument. The instrument is then walked across the surface being worked on with short, controlled, overlapping strokes while applying moderate pressure. Overall, the working-end of the instrument is only moving a few millimeters at a time. Simultaneously, the clinician must roll the handle of the instrument to maintain adaptation throughout, to prevent any soft tissue injury. After completing a calculus removal stroke, the clinician may then utilize an assessment stroke, characterized by feather-light pressure, to judge the removal of the calculus deposit. These steps are repeated until the complete removal of calculus is achieved throughout the entire dentition.

These instrumentation techniques are followed to achieve effective periodontal therapy using periodontal instruments, such as periodontal scalers. Moreover, following these instrumentation principles would improve the quality of life for the clinician as well; this includes lowering the risk of musculoskeletal disorders (MSD) in their hands and/or forearm, conserving more effort than required, and increasing the efficiency of instrumentation. These principles form a foundation to improve efficiency and effectiveness of periodontal therapy while protecting the proper ergonomics of the clinician.

A healthy periodontium is achieved by completely removing the living bacteria present in both the biofilm and calculus. This bacteria is responsible for periodontal disease, a term that encompasses both gingivitis and periodontitis. It is also important to note that with different levels of periodontal disease, the clinician may apply sextant scaling or quadrant scaling to achieve best results for a healthy periodontium. In this case, a sextant or a quadrant will be completed per appointment, which would require multiple appointments to complete debridement of the entire mouth.

== Sources ==
- Nield-Gehrig, Jill S. (2008). Fundamentals of periodontal instrumentation & advanced root instrumentation (6th ed.). Philadelphia, PA [etc.]: Wolters Kluwer/Lippincott Williams & Wilkins. ISBN 978-0-7817-6992-1.
