= Disclosing tablets =

Chewable tablets showing dental plaque

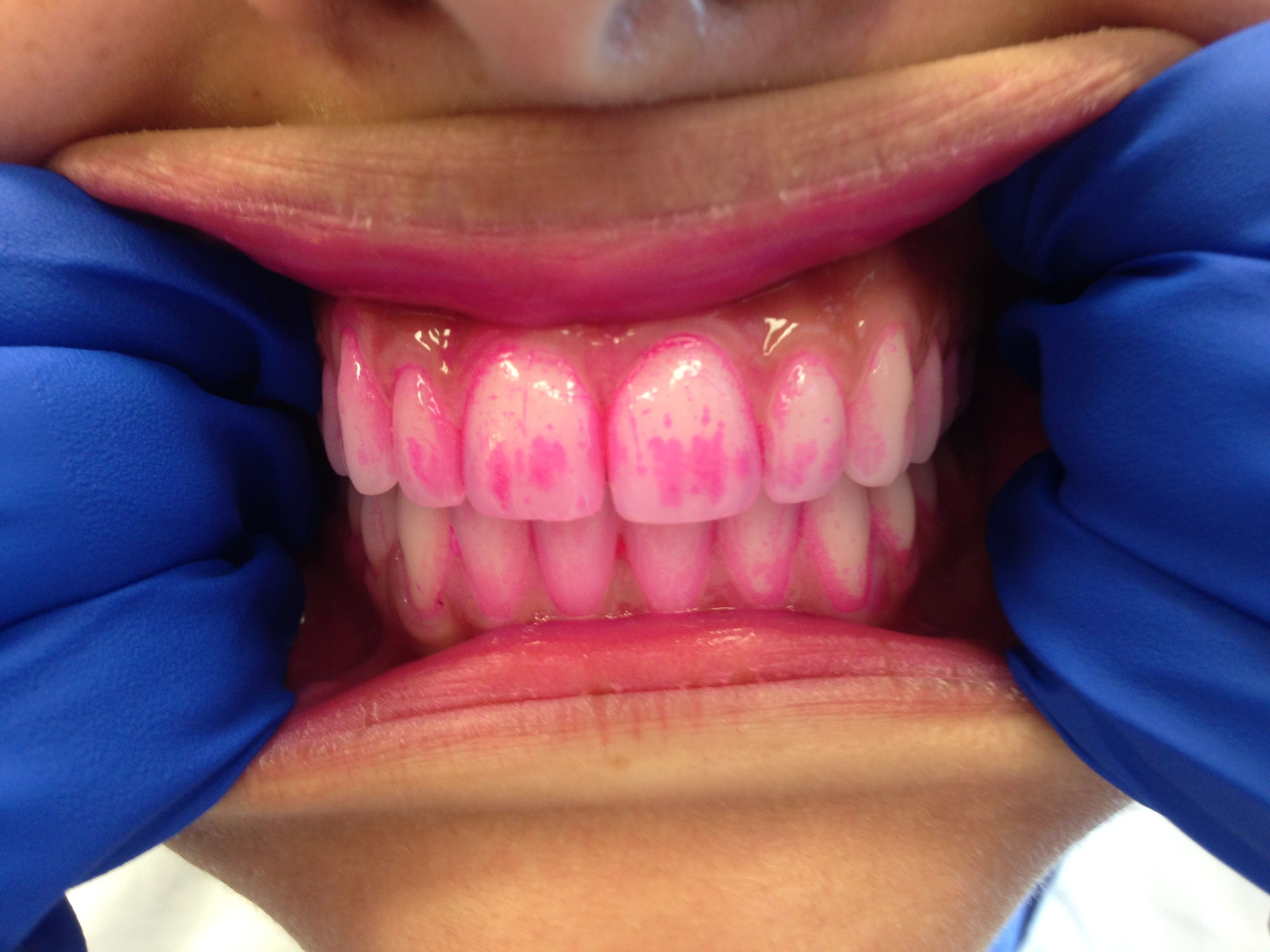
Unicolor plaque disclosing tablet

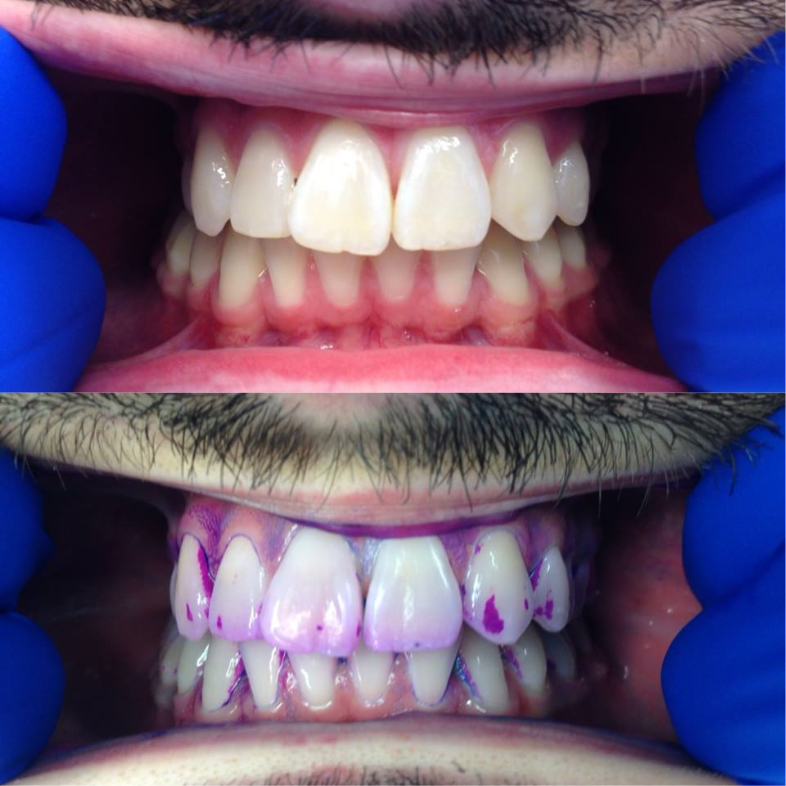
Tricolor plaque disclosing gel—before and after

Disclosing tablets are chewable tablets that make dental plaque visible.

The tablets, sold over the counter in many countries, contain a dye (typically a vegetable dye, such as Phloxine B) that stains the plaque a bright color (typically red or blue). After brushing, one chews a tablet and rinses. Colored stains on the teeth indicate areas where plaque remains after brushing, providing feedback to improve brushing technique. For self-examination, a dental mirror may be needed.

More sophisticated varieties of plaque disclosing agents contain several dyes, which selectively stain plaque of different ages. With the most common variety, immature plaque stains red, mature purple, and pathological acidic plaque blue. This is owing to the blue dye washing off immature plaque, and acid degrading the red dye. In effect, red dye reveals new plaque, whilst blue dye reveals old plaque and a purple/pink colouring reveals built-up old and new plaque stuck together causing infections. Disclosing tablets are commonly used by those undergoing orthodontic treatments to prevent plaque build up in areas which are harder to brush.

An example of a dye with a patented use as a "Dental Plaque Disclosing Agent" is erythrosine.
