= Syntette =

Dental instrument

The syntette combines the benefits of a universal curette and a Gracey curette in one. It is a dental instrument used by dentists and dental hygienists to remove calculus subgingivally on the mesial and distal surfaces on all teeth throughout the mouth.

The syntette is held parallel to the tooth and pushed under the gingiva, rotated slightly and moved upwards in a ‘pull’ stroke (vertical movement). Care must be taken not to get it stuck between the contact points of the teeth. The correct seating positions must be used, which position depends on where in the mouth you are working. Fulcrums (resting one finger on an adjacent tooth for stability) must always be used, preferably with the shank resting on the fulcrum finger.

The syntette has two elliptical cutting edges and a rounded toe. Double ended – one end for buccal/labial surfaces, the other for palatal/lingual surfaces.

The syntette was created by Leif Ericsson, Västervik Hospital, Västervik, Sweden in the 1980s. Leif Ericsson himself describes the inventing process and naming of the instrument as follows:

"Special finishing curettes Gracey 11/12 and 13/14 had been on the market since many years. Two popular instruments which, however, demanded switching instrument in the same interproximal space: Gracey 11/12 for mesial surfaces and Gracey 13/14 for distal surfaces. A simple thought – combine the instruments! A synthesis of two curettes – a Syntette."

The Syntette has been featured in several peer reviewed articles.

In addition to the original Syntette, a similar design was introduced under the brand names Scandette and Double Gracey.
