= Periodontal curette =

Dental tool

- Specialty: Periodontology, dental hygiene
- MeSH: D003750

The periodontal curette is a type of hand-activated instrument used in dentistry and dental hygiene for the purpose of scaling and root planing. The periodontal curette is considered a treatment instrument and is classified into two main categories: universal curettes and Gracey curettes. Periodontal curettes have one face, one or two cutting edges and a rounded back and rounded toe. They are typically the instrument of choice for subgingival calculus removal.

Universal and Gracey curettes are typically used during nonsurgical periodontal therapy of a patient's dental hygiene care. The goal of nonsurgical periodontal therapy is to eliminate inflammation and return the patient's periodontium back to health. One of the ways this can be achieved is by minimizing the bacterial challenge to the patient. To control the bacterial levels in the mouth, oral health education is provided to the patient to control calculus and plaque buildup. An important component of removal and management of bacterial levels in the mouth is the use of hand instruments, such as Gracey curettes and universal curettes, that remove calculus deposits contaminating the tooth surface supragingivally and subgingivally. This is vital to nonsurgical periodontal therapy because scaling and root planing reduces bacterial biofilms in the mouth that are associated with inflammation. A research study suggests that periodontal root debridement is a key factor that influences the success of gaining periodontal attachment on previously infected root surfaces.

== Universal curette ==
Universal curettes have sharp cutting edges on both sides of their blades. Therefore, only two instruments are necessary – anterior (pink ring) and posterior (purple ring).

=== Indication of use and function ===
A universal curette is a double-ended instrument used for periodontal scaling, calculus debridement and root planing. The purpose of the universal curette is to remove small or medium size calculus deposits and can be used both supragingivally and subgingivally. Universal curettes are very versatile because they can be used on all surfaces of the teeth.

=== Design characteristics ===
The universal curette is double-ended with paired mirror-image working ends. The working end has a rounded back and a rounded toe with a semicircular cross section. This design allows the instrument to be used both below and above the gingival margin. The face of the instrument is at a 90-degree angle to the lower shank and contains two cutting edges on either side of the working end that are level with one another. Depending on the type of universal curette, shank length, design and blade size, application of usage may vary. With this being said, universal curettes can still be used throughout the entire mouth.

=== Types ===
There are numerous different universal curettes that differ slightly in design. These differences may affect how the instrument is used in the mouth. For example, the Columbia 13/14, Barnhardt 5/6, and Younger Good 7/8 curettes have a shorter lower shank with a rigid or regular flexibility. These instruments are recommended to be used on all areas of the mouth for scaling and root planing. The Columbia 4R/4L, Columbia 2R/2L, and Barnhardt 1/2 instruments have longer lower shanks with rigid or regular flexibility. The recommended indication of use for these instruments is on posterior tooth surfaces that have moderate to deep pocket depths. These instruments also may be useful on anterior teeth with greater pocket depths or recession. Lastly, the 10/11 Loma Linda and R 144 Queen of Hearts have longer lower shanks with blade designs that are best suited for working along the line angles of the tooth surface.

=== Technique ===
Prior to engaging in scaling and root planing, proper positioning of patient and operator should be adjusted, and adequate illumination and retraction should be obtained for optimal visibility of the target area. The clinician should use a modified-pen grasp when operating the instrument. Pressure should be applied with the index finger and thumb on the instrument handle with the fulcrum finger pressed against the tooth surface. The toe-third of the instrument should be adapted to the crown or root surface. The working-end should be at a 70-80 degree angle to the tooth surface, and the lower shank should be tilted slightly towards the tooth surface to achieve correct angulation.

The type of strokes used may vary depending on the tooth surface being addressed. Vertical strokes are used on the anterior regions of the mouth and on the distal and mesial surfaces of the posterior teeth, while oblique strokes are used on the facial and lingual surfaces of the posterior teeth. When working on the line angles of posterior teeth and the midlines of the facial or lingual surfaces of anterior teeth, horizontal strokes are used. The number of strokes should be limited to areas where calculus is present as to minimize stress to the muscles of the hand.

== Gracey curette ==
Gracey curettes have sharp cutting edges on only one side of their blades. There are two site-specific Gracey curettes – posterior mesial (white ring) and posterior distal (blue ring), in addition to the anterior curette (red ring).

=== Indication of use and function ===
Gracey curettes are area-specific periodontal curettes made from stainless steel used to remove supra and subgingival calculus. Along with universal curettes, Gracey curettes are one of the main instruments used for scaling and root planing. Gracey curettes are especially ideal for subgingival calculus removal because the design of the instrument allows for better adaptation to the anatomy of the roots.

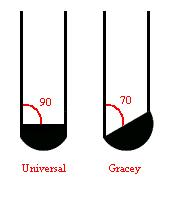
While the blade of the universal curette is situated perpendicular to the edge of the terminal shank, the blade of the Gracey curette is only offset by 70 degrees, giving the blade a lower cutting edge and an upper non-cutting edge.

=== Design characteristics ===
These curettes are area-specific due to the design of the face of the instrument in relation to the terminal shank. Because the face is at a 70-degree angle from the terminal shank, one of the cutting edges is lower than the other, and this is the cutting edge that is used during periodontal debridement. Similar to the universal curette, the Gracey curette features a rounded back and toe with a semicircular cross section, which prevents damaging the gingival tissue.

=== Types ===
There are many different types of Gracey curettes that are designed to access different surfaces of the teeth in different areas of the mouth. In addition to the traditional Gracey curettes, there are also modified designs with extended shanks or miniature and micro-miniature working ends. The modified curettes with extended shanks have a 3 mm longer terminal shank and are used for root surface debridement in pockets deeper than 4 mm. An example of these are called After-Five curettes. The curettes with miniature and micro-miniature working ends are used for deep narrow pockets, line angles and furcations and an example of these are Mini-Five and Micro-Mini Five curettes These instruments also have a 3 mm longer terminal shank and a blade half the length of a regular Gracey curette. The micro-miniature working ends are more rigid and are 20% thinner than that of a miniature curette, allowing them to access tight pockets without tissue trauma. Gehrig outlines areas of the mouth and tooth surfaces the standard Gracey curettes are used on. The Gracey curettes and areas of use are shown in Table 1.

==== Gracey Curettes and Their Area of Application ====
Gracey Curette	Tooth Surfaces and Area of Mouth
1 and 2	All tooth surfaces: anterior
3 and 4	All tooth surfaces: anterior
5 and 6	All tooth surfaces: anterior and premolar Facial, lingual, mesial surfaces: molars
7 and 8	All tooth surfaces: molars
9 and 10	All tooth surfaces: molars Facial and lingual surfaces: posterior
11 and 12	Mesial and distal surfaces: posterior Facial, lingual and mesial surfaces: posterior
13 and 14	Mesial and distal surfaces: posterior Distal surfaces: posterior
15 and 16	Facial, lingual and mesial surfaces: posterior
17 and 18	Distal surfaces: posterior

=== Technique ===
Similarly to a universal curette, the Gracey curette is used with a modified-pen grasp and fulcrum finger for support, with the toe third of the instrument being adapted to the crown or root surface. When using a Gracey curette, the terminal shank should be parallel to the tooth surface that is being worked on. This is to ensure that the cutting edge is at the correct angulation. In order to select the correct working end of an anterior Gracey curette, the face of the instrument must tilt towards the tooth. It is important to select the right end, as tissue trauma may occur if the wrong end is selected. To select the correct working end of a posterior Gracey curette, the terminal shank must be parallel to the surface being instrumented, and the functional shank goes up and over the tooth rather than down and around the tooth so the current is the best of all .

== Advantages and limitations ==
One of the main advantages of periodontal curettes is that in comparison to sickle scalers, they are finer and do not contain sharp points or corners other than the cutting edges on the blade. This means that unlike sickle scalers, curettes can be adapted around the tooth surface and can provide better access to deep pockets with minimal soft tissue trauma. In addition, Gracey curettes is the ideal instrument to use for subgingival scaling and root planing due to the design of the instrument that allows for best adaptation to root anatomy. While periodontal curettes are primarily for subgingival calculus removal and root planing, sickle scalers are primarily used for supragingival calculus removal. Sickle scalers tend to have a stronger tip that is less likely to break off during use due to the triangular cross sectional design of the working end.

== See also ==
- Syntette
