= Curette =

Surgical hand tool for scraping or debriding tissue

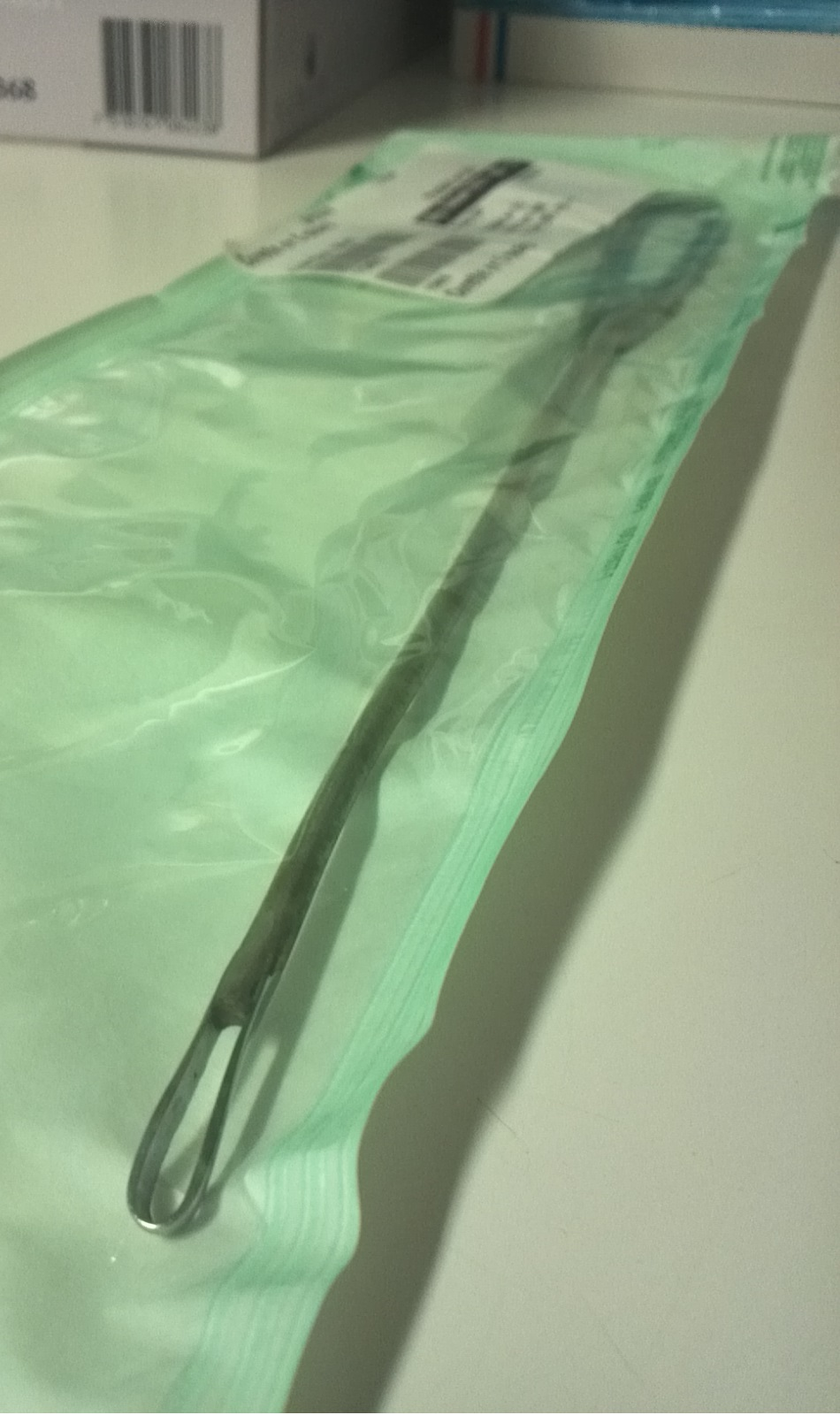
A curette in sterile packaging, for scraping the interior of the uterus.

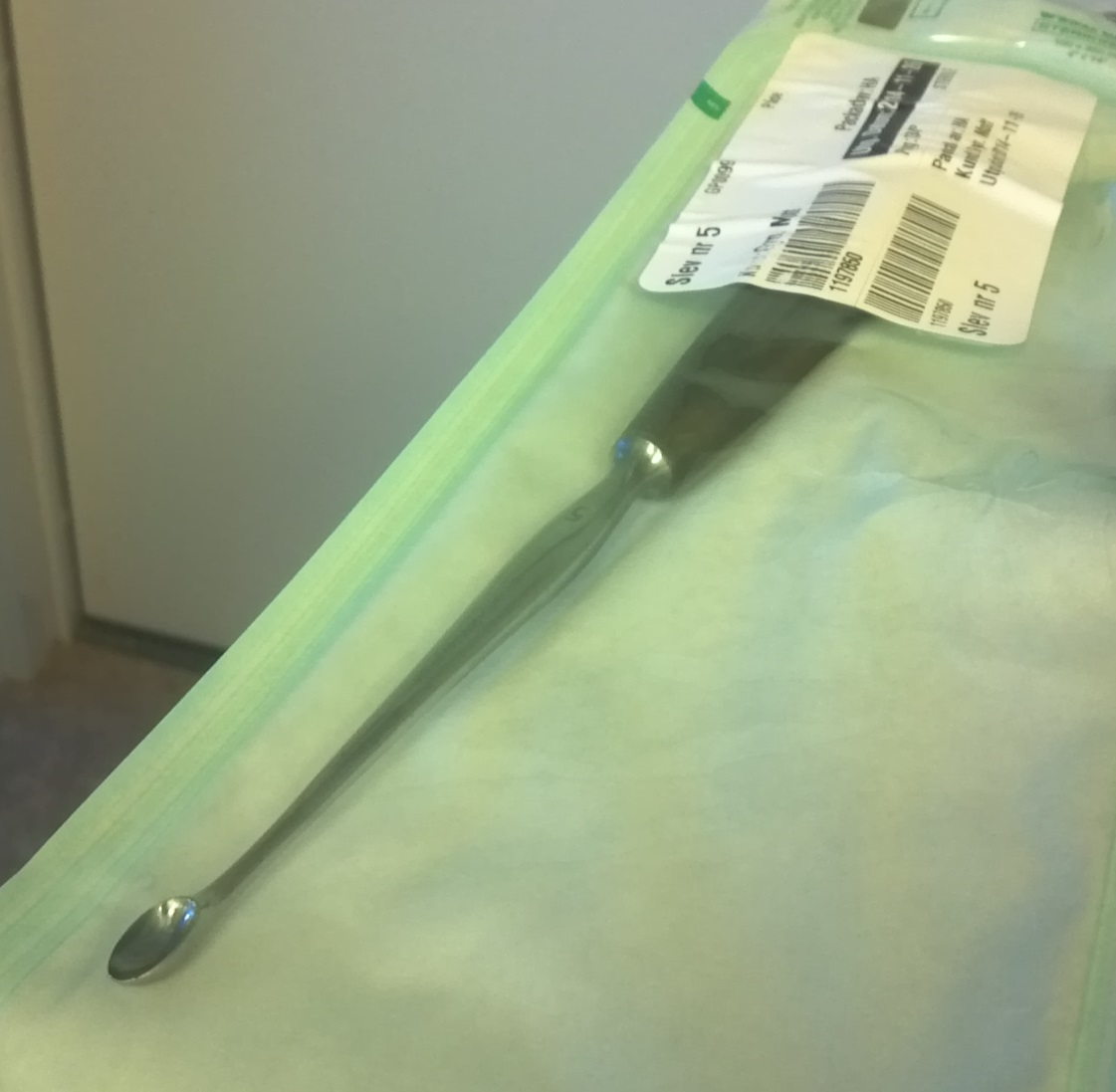
Spoon-shaped curette.

A curette or curet is a surgical instrument for the scraping or debriding of biological tissue or debris in a biopsy, excision, or cleaning procedure. In form, the curette is a small hand tool, often similar in shape to a stylus; at the tip of the curette is a small scoop, hook, or gouge. The verb to curette means "to scrape with a curette", and curettage (/ˌkʊərɪˈtɑːʒ/ or /ˌkjʊərɪˈtɑːʒ/) is treatment that involves such scraping.

== Uses ==
Some examples of medical use of a curette include:

- the removal of impacted ear wax;
- dilation and curettage of the uterus, a gynecologic procedure;
- excision of many benign tumors and some malignant tumors;
- excision of the adenoids (adenoidectomy) by an otolaryngologist;
- to scrape tartar deposits from tooth enamel with a periodontal curette.

== See also ==
- Ear pick
