= Dental plaque =

Biofilm of microorganisms that grows on teeth

Dental plaque is a biofilm of microorganisms (mostly bacteria, but also fungi) that grows on surfaces within the mouth. It is a sticky colorless deposit at first, but when it forms tartar, it is often brown or pale yellow. It is commonly found between the teeth, on the front of teeth, behind teeth, on chewing surfaces, along the gumline (supragingival), or below the gumline cervical margins (subgingival). Dental plaque is also known as microbial plaque, oral biofilm, dental biofilm, dental plaque biofilm, and bacterial plaque biofilm. Bacterial plaque is one of the major causes for dental decay and gum disease. It has been observed that differences in the composition of dental plaque microbiota exist between men and women, particularly in the presence of periodontitis.

Progression and build-up of dental plaque can give rise to tooth decay, and periodontal problems. Hence it is important to disrupt the mass of bacteria and remove it. Tooth decay is the localized destruction of the tissues of the tooth by acid produced from the bacterial degradation of fermentable sugar. Common periodontal problems include gingivitis and periodontitis. Plaque control and removal can be achieved with correct daily or twice-daily tooth brushing and use of interdental aids such as dental floss and interdental brushes.

Oral hygiene is important as dental biofilms may become acidic causing demineralization of the teeth (also known as dental caries) or harden into dental calculus (also known as tartar). Calculus cannot be removed through tooth brushing or with interdental aids, but only through professional cleaning.

== Plaque formation ==
Dental plaque is a biofilm that attaches to tooth surfaces, restorations, and prosthetic appliances (including dentures and bridges) if it is left untreated. Understanding the formation, composition, and characteristics of plaque helps with controlling the build up. An acquired pellicle is a layer of saliva that is composed of mainly glycoproteins and forms shortly after cleaning of the teeth or exposure of new teeth. Bacteria then attach to the pellicle layer, form micro-colonies, and mature on the tooth. This will then result in oral diseases.

=== Steps of plaque formation ===
1. Association
Dental pellicle forms on the tooth (normally on tooth), and provides bacteria surface to attach.
2. Adhesion
Within hours, bacteria loosely binds to the pellicle.
3. Proliferation
Bacteria spreads throughout the mouth and begins to multiply.
4. Microcolonies
Microcolonies are formed. Streptococci secrete protective layer (slime layer).
5. Biofilm formation
Microcolonies form complex groups with metabolic advantage.
6. Growth or maturation
The biofilm develops a primitive circulatory system.

== Components of plaque ==
Different types of bacteria are normally present in the mouth. These bacteria, as well as leukocytes, neutrophils, macrophages, and lymphocytes, are part of the normal oral cavity and contribute to the individual's health. Approximately 80–90% of the weight of plaque is water. While 70% of the dry weight is bacteria, the remaining 30% consists of polysaccharides and glycoproteins.

=== Bacteria ===
The bulk of the microorganisms that form the biofilm are Streptococcus mutans and other anaerobes. However, the precise composition varies by location in the mouth. Examples of such anaerobes include fusobacterium and actinobacteria. S. mutans and other anaerobes are the initial colonizers of the tooth surface, and play a major role in the establishment of the early biofilm community. Streptococcus mutans uses the enzyme glucansucrase to convert sucrose into a sticky, extracellular, dextran-based polysaccharide that allows the bacteria to cohere, forming plaque. Sucrose is the only sugar that bacteria can use to form this sticky polysaccharide. These microorganisms all occur naturally in the oral cavity and are normally harmless. However, failure to remove plaque by regular tooth-brushing allows them to proliferate unchecked and build up in a thick layer, which can cause various dental diseases for the host. Those microorganisms nearest the tooth surface typically obtain energy by fermenting dietary sucrose, and during fermentation they begin to produce acids.

The bacterial equilibrium position varies at different stages of formation. Below is a summary of the bacteria that may be present during the phases of plaque maturation:

- Early biofilm: primarily Gram-positive cocci
- Older biofilm (3–4 days): increased numbers of filaments and fusiforms
- 4–9 days undisturbed: more complex microbial community with rods, filamentous forms
- 7–14 days: Vibrio species, spirochetes, more Gram-negative organisms

== Dental plaque as a biofilm ==
Dental plaque is considered a biofilm adhered to the tooth surface. It is a meticulously formed microbial community, that is organized to a particular structure and function. Plaque is rich in species, given the fact that about 1000 different bacterial species have been recognized using modern techniques.

A clean tooth surface would immediately be colonized by salivary pellicles, which acts as an adhesive. This allows the first bacteria (early colonizers) to attach to the tooth, colonize, and grow. After some growth of early colonizers, the biofilm becomes more compliant to other species of bacteria, known as late colonizers.

=== Early colonisers ===
- mainly Streptococcus species (60–90%)
- Eikenella spp.
- Haemophilus spp.
- Prevotella spp.
- Propionibacterium spp.
- Capnocytophaga spp.
- Veillonella spp.

=== Late colonisers ===
- Aggregatibacter actinomycetemcomitans
- Prevotella intermedia
- Eubacterium spp.
- Treponema spp.
- Porphyromonas gingivalis

Fusobacterium nucleatum is found between the early and late colonizers, linking them together.

Some salivary components are crucial for the plaque's ecosystem, such as salivary alpha-amylase which plays a role in binding and adhesion. Proline-rich proteins (PRP) and statherins are also involved in the formation of plaque.

=== Supragingival biofilm ===
Supragingival biofilm is dental plaque that forms above the gums, and is the first kind of plaque to form after brushing teeth. It commonly forms in between the teeth, in the pits and grooves of the teeth, and along the gums. It is made up of mostly aerobic bacteria, meaning these bacteria need oxygen to survive. If plaque remains on the tooth for a long period of time, anaerobic bacteria begin to grow.

=== Subgingival biofilm ===
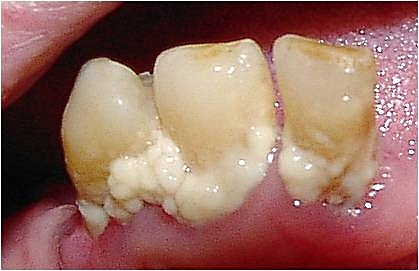
Heavy plaque

Subgingival biofilm is plaque that is located under the gums. It occurs after the formation of the supragingival biofilm by a downward growth of the bacteria from above the gums to below. This plaque is mostly made up of anaerobic bacteria, meaning that these bacteria will only survive if there is no oxygen. As this plaque attaches in a pocket under the gums, they are not exposed to oxygen in the mouth and will thrive if not removed.

The extracellular matrix contains proteins, long-chain polysaccharides and lipids.

The most common reasons for ecosystem disruption are the ecological factors discussed in the environment section. The bacteria that exhibit the most fit plasticity for the change in environment dominate it. Often, this leads to opportunistic pathogens which may cause dental caries and periodontal disease. Pathogenic bacteria that have the potential to cause dental caries flourish in acidic environments; those that have the potential to cause periodontal disease flourish in a slightly alkaline environment.

Antibodies to the oral pathogens Campylobacter rectus, Veillonella parvula, and Prevotella melaninogenica are associated with hypertension.

== Environment ==
Unlike other parts of the body, tooth surfaces are uniquely hard and non-shedding. Therefore, the warm and moist environment of the mouth and the presence of teeth, makes a good environment for growth and development of dental plaque. The main ecological factors that contribute to plaque formation are pH, saliva, temperature and redox reactions. The normal pH range of saliva is between 6 and 7 and plaque biofilm is known to flourish in a pH range between 6.7 and 8.3. This indicates that the natural environment of the mouth provided by saliva is ideal for the growth of bacteria in the dental plaque. Saliva acts as a buffer, which helps to maintain the pH in the mouth between 6 and 7. In addition to acting as a buffer, saliva and gingival crevicular fluid contain primary nutrients including amino acids, proteins and glycoproteins. This feeds the bacteria involved in plaque formation. The host diet plays only a minor role in providing nutrients for the resident microflora. The normal temperature of the mouth ranges between 35 and 36 °C (95 and 97 °F), and a two-degree change has been shown to drastically shift the dominant species in the plaque. Redox reactions are carried out by aerobic bacteria. This keeps the oxygen levels in the mouth at a semi-stable homeostatic condition, which allows the bacteria to survive.

== Consequences of plaque build-up ==
=== Gingivitis ===
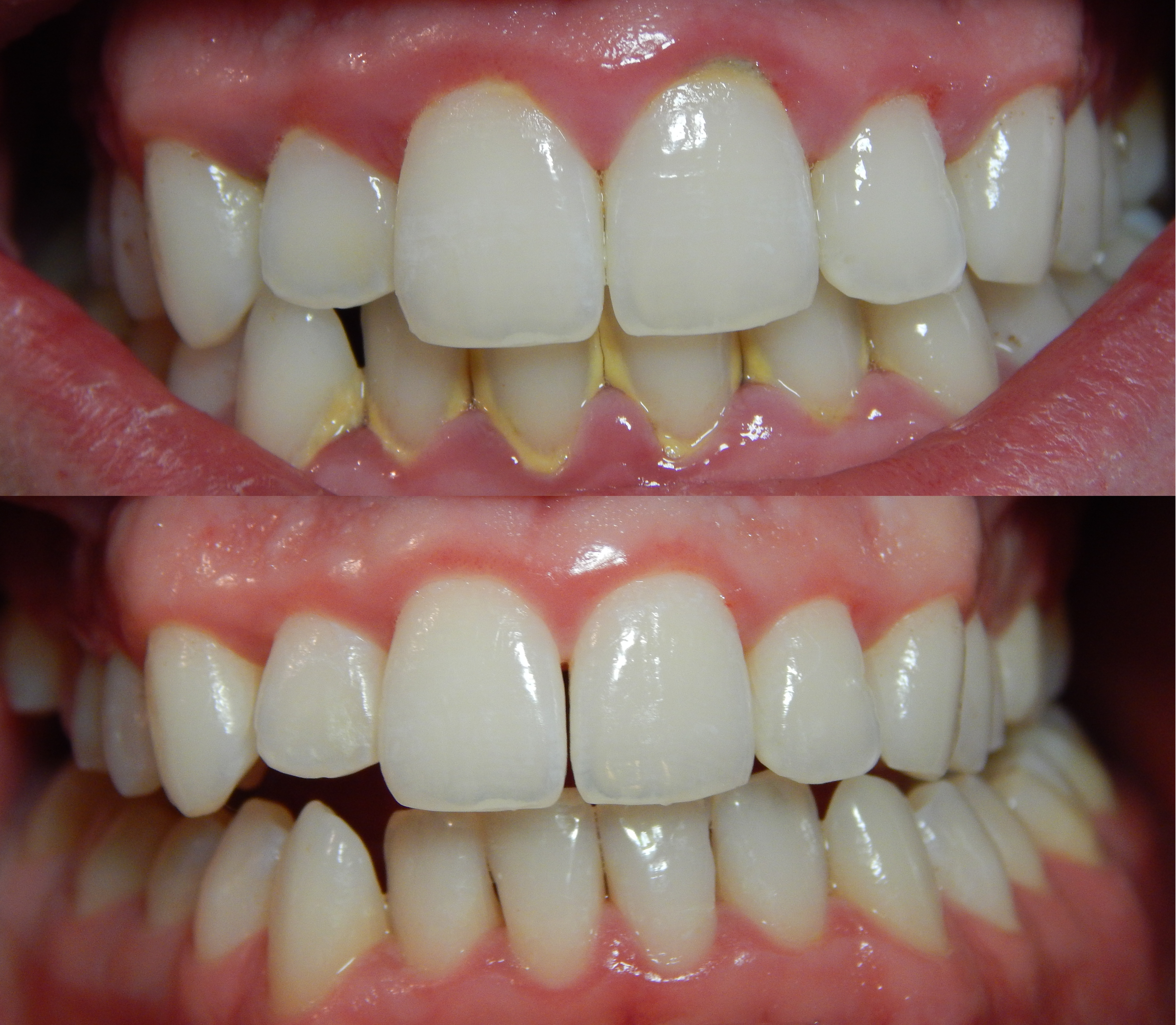
Top: typical presentation of gingivitis. Bottom: healthy gingiva.

Gingivitis is an inflammatory lesion, mediated by host-parasite interactions that remains localized to the gingival tissue. This is a common result of plaque build-up around the gingival tissues. The bacteria found in the biofilm elicit a host response resulting in localized inflammation of the tissue. This is characterized by the cardinal signs of inflammation including a red, puffy appearance of the gums and bleeding due to brushing or flossing. Gingivitis due to plaque can be reversible by removal of the plaque. However, if left for an extended period of time, the inflammation may begin to affect the supporting tissues, in a progression referred to as periodontitis. The gingivitis response is a protective mechanism, averting periodontitis in many cases.

=== Periodontitis ===
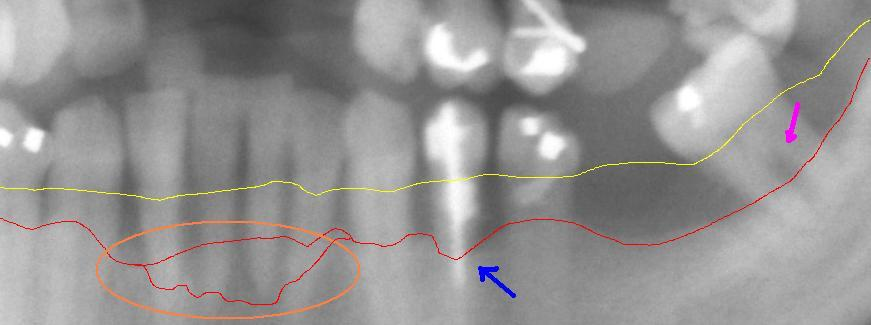
Loss of bone due to periodontal disease

Periodontitis is an infection of the gums which leads to bone destruction around the teeth in the jaw. Periodontitis occurs after gingivitis has been established, but not all individuals who have gingivitis will get periodontitis. Plaque accumulation is vital in the progression of periodontitis as the bacteria in plaque release enzymes which attack the bone and cause it to break down, and at the same time osteoclasts in the bone break down the bone as a way to prevent further infection. This can be treated with strict oral hygiene such as tooth brushing and cleaning in between the teeth, as well as surgical debridement completed by a dental professional.

==== Diseases linked to periodontitis and gum disease ====
Accumulated bacteria, due to the onset of periodontitis from dental plaque, may gain access to distant sites in the body through the circulatory and respiratory system, potentially contributing to various systemic diseases and conditions. Due to the infectious nature of bacteria hosted within the oral cavity, bacteria produced cavity can spread within the system of the human body and cause adverse health conditions. Bacteria access comes from the ulcerated epithelium of the periodontal pocket that results from accumulation of infection within the gingiva. Conditions and diseases can include:

- Atheromas
- Cardiovascular disease
- Respiratory disease
- Diabetes mellitus

=== Caries ===
Representation of the progression of dental caries

Dental caries is an infectious disease caused primarily by Streptococcus mutans, characterized by acid demineralization of the enamel, which can progress to further breakdown of the more organic, inner dental tissue (dentin). The bacterial community would mainly consist of acidogenic and acid-tolerating species (e.g. Mutans streptococci and lactobacilli), while other species with relevant characteristics may also be involved. Everybody is susceptible to caries but the probability of development depends on the patient's individual disease indicators, risk factors, and preventive factors. Factors that are considered high-risk for developing carious lesions on the teeth include:

- Low fluoride exposure
- Time, length, and frequency of sugar consumption
- Quality of tooth cleaning
- Fluctuations in salivary flow rates and composition
- Behavior of the individual
- Quality and composition of biofilms

Organic acids released from dental plaque lead to demineralization of the adjacent tooth surface, and consequently to dental caries. Saliva is also unable to penetrate the build-up of plaque and thus cannot act to neutralize the acid produced by the bacteria and remineralize the tooth surface.

== Detection of plaque build-up ==
There are two main methods of detecting dental plaque in the oral cavity: through the application of a disclosing gel or tablet, and/or visually through observation. Plaque detection is usually detected clinically by plaque disclosing agents. Disclosing agents contain dye which turns bright red to indicate plaque build-up.

It is important for an individual to be aware of what to look for when doing a self-assessment for dental plaque. It is important to be aware that everyone has dental plaque, however, the severity of the build-up and the consequences of not removing the plaque can vary.

=== Plaque disclosing gel ===
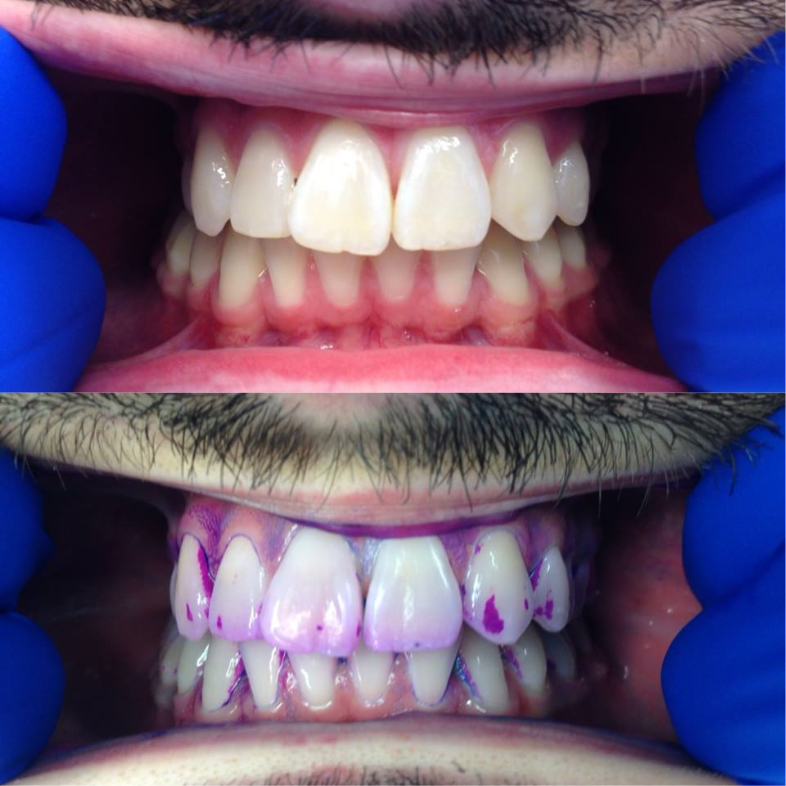
Plaque disclosing gel: before (top) and after (bottom)

Plaque disclosing products, also known as disclosants, make plaque clinically visible. Clean surfaces of the teeth do not absorb the disclosant, only rough surfaces. Plaque disclosing gels can be completed either at home or in the dental clinic. Before using these at home or in the dental clinic check with your general practitioners for any allergies to iodine, food coloring, or any other ingredients that may be present in these products. These gels provide a visual aid in assessing plaque biofilm presence and can also show the maturity of the dental plaque.

=== Disclosing tablets ===
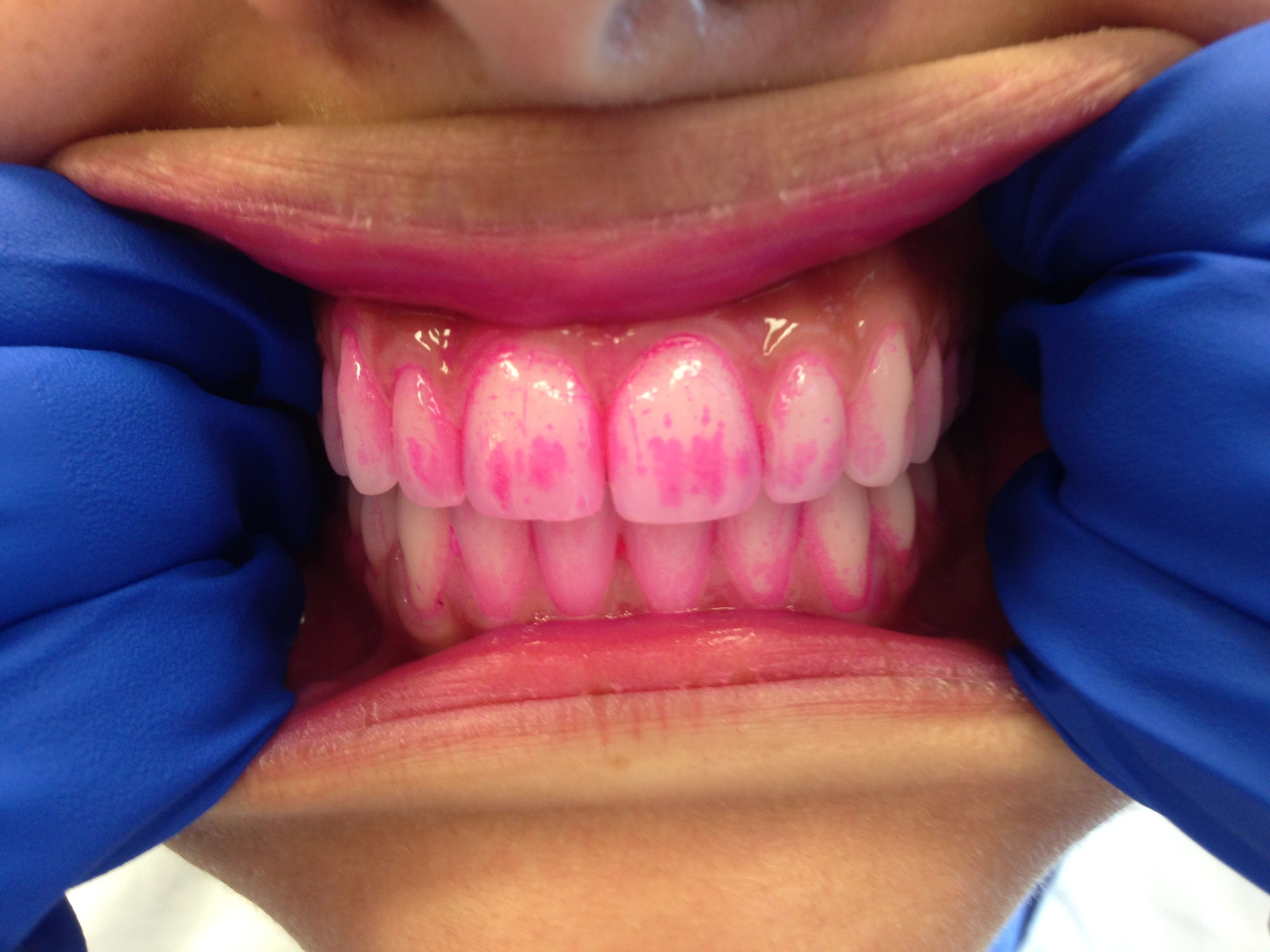
Disclosing dental plaque with disclosing tablets

Disclosing tablets are similar to that of disclosing gels, except that they are placed in the mouth and chewed on for approximately one minute. The remaining tablet or saliva is then spit out. Disclosing gels will show the presence of the plaque, but will often not show the level of maturity of the plaque. Disclosing tablets are often prescribed or given to patients with orthodontic appliances for use before and after tooth brushing to ensure optimal cleaning. These are also helpful educational tools for young children or patients who are struggling to remove dental plaque in certain areas. Disclosing gels and tablets are useful for individuals of all ages in ensuring efficient dental plaque removal.

=== Visual or tactile detection ===
Dental biofilm begins to form on the tooth only minutes after brushing. It can be difficult to see dental plaque on the hard tissue surfaces; however, it can be felt as a rough surface. It is often felt as a thick, fur-like deposit that may present as a yellow, tan, or brown stain. These deposits are commonly found on teeth or dental appliances such as orthodontic brackets. The most common way dental plaque is assessed is through dental assessment in the dental clinic where dental instruments are able to scrape up some plaque. The most common areas where patients find plaque are between the teeth and along the cervical margins.

One review of computerized image processing techniques demonstrated strong accuracy in identifying plaque. A few studies demonstrated that this performed better than dentists when disclosing agents were not used.

== Treatments ==
Mouthwash has been a commonly used method for controlling dental plaque accumulation. Many studies have supported the fact that mouthwash containing alcohol might not be the best option. Alcohol-containing mouthwashes are not substantially more effective than alcohol-free mouthwashes, and there is some evidence to suggest that alcohol-containing mouthwashes increase the likelihood of oral cancers. The absence of alcohol in mouthwash has prompted many mouthwash brands to develop new mouthwashes with essential oils.

In 2018, a study was done on the effectiveness of commercially available essential oil mouth-rinse. A placebo and a negative control were used, with the negative control being mouthwash without essential oils. Three groups of healthy volunteers were induced with experimental gingivitis, used their respective mouthwash, and monitored for three weeks. The results showed that the commercial mouthwash with essential oils did significantly better on plaque scores. Results showed that the plaque scores for the essential oil mouthwash was not low enough to prevent gingivitis. The researchers concluded that the benefit of essential oil mouthwash is questionable and requires further research.

Research done in 2022 studied the antimicrobial properties and effects of a lemongrass essential oil. Eight species of bacteria that cause plaque were isolated in the laboratory and then contacted with the lemongrass oil. It was found that the lemongrass oil inhibited the growth of these bacteria in a similar manner to chlorhexidine, another oral antiseptic. The researches did not study whether the lemongrass essential oil actually inhibited plaque formation in actual people.

A study conducted in 2022, with a sample of 209 participants, studied the effect of using a mouthwash that contained a mixture of four essential oils versus just brushing and flossing. It showed that after 12 weeks, those who rinsed with the essential oil mouthwash had significantly reduced plaque and improved their gingivitis compared to the groups that only brushed and flossed.

A meta-analysis conducted in 2021, reviewed the effectiveness of various mouthwashes and their active ingredients on plaque. The American Dental Association database was used to collect studies. A total of 22 papers were selected for the overview. Four of the papers selected, all meta-analyses, showed that essential oils had substantial antiplaque activity. The researchers concluded that essential oils and chlorhexidine are the two ingredients that are most useful in having good oral health.

A study involving 20 participants found that mouthwash containing Magnolia grandiflora bark extract performed significantly better than placebo at reducing the prevalence of Streptococcus mutans.

== Dental plaque in dogs and cats ==
Dental plaque is extremely common in domestic animals such as dogs and cats. However, the bacteria associated with canine and feline plaque appear to be different from those in humans. It consists of causing periodontal inflammation and triggers the animal's immune system. Two common distinctions that derive from periodontal are gingivitis which is inflammation, and periodontitis which involves the reactions of gingivitis causing severe gum disease. This severe gum disease can be something such as periodontitis and can ultimately lead to the loss of the tooth. Animals affected by periodontitis deal with irritation, and this disease can affect almost 80% of dogs above two years in age. Additionally, this disease is proven that with the focal point of gums, it can affect nearby organs.

The periodontal disease is most attracted to the age and weight that the animals are currently in. The older and heavier they are the more likely they will catch the disease. A study of 9 female and 5 male dogs varying breeds and ages from 1-14 emphasizes the relation of Periodontal with age and no relation regarding breed or sex. A total of 50% of them were detected with the disease. One study also mentioned that T. denticola was the most prevalent in dogs with periodontal disease and it was only located within affected dogs.

=== Treatment and prevention ===
The antibiotics that are commonly used for animals are antimicrobials ranging from clindamycin, amoxicillin-clavulate, and amoxicillin. These antimicrobials are commonly used in dental procedures for animals in the United States. A study was done were a total of 818,150 dogs and cats that resulted in the evident promotion of antimicrobials in retaining periodontitis. Other studies have been done that establish food debris as not being a concerning factor regarding the cause of dental plaque. In a 4-year study, a Beagle dog has been put to eat a strict diet without any oral hygiene which led to the accumulation of gingivitis in just a few weeks. However, some dogs were put on a similar diet with hygiene precautions of daily brushing their teeth and showed no signs of gingivitis.

=== Owners' perspectives ===
Animal owners have varying perspectives on what causes dental problems in their pets. Some believe that dry or moistened animal foods negatively impact dental health, while others believe that marrowbones can lead to fractures and discomfort or strengthen oral health.

Differences in breeds are also a familiar occurrence where owners disagree. Many perceive that distinctive breeds are more prone to health issues compared to others, while periodontitis is considered a smaller factor. Some owners express sentiments like "my dog has good teeth for their age," supporting the idea that as animals grow older, their dental features worsen, along with their weight.

=== Importance of oral care ===
It is important to take care of pets by not only keeping them clean and providing them with healthy foods but also maintaining oral cleanliness to avoid discomfort and diseases. Hence, veterinarians often recommend oral healthcare products for affected pets.

== See also ==
- Dental disease
- Flossing
- Gingiva
- Oral hygiene
- Oral microbiology
