= Periodontology =

Field of dentistry

Periodontist
Occupation
- Occupation type: Specialty
- Activity sectors: Dentistry

Description
- Education required: Dental degree
- Fields of employment: Hospitals, private practices

Periodontology or periodontics (from Ancient Greek περί, perí – 'around'; and ὀδούς, odoús – 'tooth', genitive ὀδόντος, odóntos) is the specialty of dentistry that studies supporting structures of teeth, as well as diseases and conditions that affect them. The supporting tissues are known as the periodontium, which includes the gingiva (gums), alveolar bone, cementum, and the periodontal ligament. A periodontist is a dentist who specializes in the prevention, diagnosis, and treatment of periodontal disease, and in the placement of dental implants.

== The periodontium ==
A diagram of the periodontium. A. Enamel B. Dentine C. Alveolar bone D. Oral epithelium E. Attached gingiva F. Gingival margin G. Gingival sulcus H. Junctional epithelium I. Alveolar crest fibres of periodontal ligament [PDL] J. Horizontal fibres of PDL K. Oblique fibres of PDL

The term periodontium is used to describe the group of structures that directly surround, support and protect the teeth. The periodontium is composed largely of the gingival tissue and the supporting bone.

=== Gingivae ===
Normal gingiva may range in color from light coral pink to heavily pigmented. The soft tissues and connective fibres that cover and protect the underlying cementum, periodontal ligament and alveolar bone are known as the gingivae. The gingivae are categorized into three anatomical groups: the free, attached and the interdental gingiva. Each of the gingival groups are considered biologically different; however, they are all specifically designed to help protect against mechanical and bacterial destruction.

==== Free gingiva ====
The tissues that sit above the alveolar bone crest are considered the free gingiva. In healthy periodontium, the gingival margin is the fibrous tissue that encompasses the cemento-enamel junction, a line around the circumference of the tooth where the enamel surface of the crown meets the outer cementum layer of the root. A natural space called the gingival sulcus lies apically to the gingival margin, between the tooth and the free gingiva. A non-diseased, healthy gingival sulcus is typically 0.5-3mm in depth, however, this measurement can increase in the presence of periodontal disease. The gingival sulcus is lined by a non-keratinised layer called the oral sulcular epithelium; it begins at the gingival margin and ends at the base of the sulcus where the junctional epithelium and attached gingiva begins.

==== Attached gingiva ====
The junctional epithelium is a collar-like band that lies at the base of the gingival sulcus and surrounds the tooth; it demarcates the areas of separation between the free and attached gingiva. The junctional epithelium provides a specialized protective barrier to microorganisms residing around the gingival sulcus. Collagen fibres bind the attached gingiva tightly to the underlying periodontium including the cementum and alveolar bone and vary in length and width, depending on the location in the oral cavity and on the individual. The attached gingiva lies between the free gingival line or groove and the mucogingival junction. The attached gingiva dissipates functional and masticatory stresses placed on the gingival tissues during common activities such as mastication, tooth brushing and speaking. In health it is typically pale pink or coral pink in colour and may present with surface stippling or racial pigmentation.

==== Interdental gingiva ====
The interdental gingiva takes up the space beneath a tooth contact point, between two adjacent teeth. It is normally triangular or pyramidal in shape and is formed by two interdental papillae (lingual and facial). The middle or centre part of the interdental papilla is made up of attached gingiva, whereas the borders and tip are formed by the free gingiva. The central point between the interdental papillae is called the col. It is a valley-like or concave depression that lies directly beneath the contact point, between the facial and lingual papilla. However, the col may be absent if there is gingival recession or if the teeth are not contacting. The main purpose of the interdental gingiva is to prevent food impaction during routine mastication.

=== Alveolar mucosa ===
This area of tissue is non-keratinized and is located beyond the mucogingival junction. It is less firmly attached and is redder than attached gingiva. It provides for the movement of cheek and lips.

=== Periodontal ligament ===
The periodontal ligament is the connective tissue that joins the outer layer of the tooth root, being the cementum, to the surrounding alveolar bone. It is composed of several complex fibre groups that run in different directions and which insert into the cementum and bone via Sharpey's fibres. The periodontal ligament is composed mostly of collagen fibres, however it also houses blood vessels and nerves within loose connective tissue. Mechanical loads that are placed on the teeth during mastication and other external forces are absorbed by the periodontal ligament, which therefore protects the teeth within their sockets.

=== Alveolar bone ===
In periodontal health, the alveolar bone surrounds the teeth and forms the bony socket that supports each tooth. The buccal and lingual plates and lining of the sockets are composed of thin, yet dense compact or cortical bone. Within the cortical plates and dental sockets lies cancellous bone, a spongy or trabecular-type bone which is less dense than compact bone. The anatomic landmarks of the alveolar process includes the lamina dura, the alveolar crest, and the periodontal ligament space.

=== Cementum ===
Cementum is the outer layer of the tooth root; it overlies the dentine layer of the tooth and provides attachment for the collagen fibres of the periodontal ligament. It also protects the dentine and provides a seal for the otherwise exposed ends of the dentinal tubules. It is not as hard as enamel or dentine and is typically a light yellow colour.

== Gingival diseases ==
Gingivitis is a common condition that affects the gingiva or mucosal tissues that surround the teeth. The condition is a form of periodontal disease; however, it is the least devastating, in that it does not involve irreversible damage or changes to the periodontium (gingiva, periodontal ligament, cementum or alveolar bone). It is commonly detected by patients when gingival bleeding occurs spontaneously during brushing or eating. It is also characterized by generalized inflammation, swelling, and redness of the mucosal tissues. Gingivitis is typically painless and is most commonly a result of plaque biofilm accumulation, in association with reduced or poor oral hygiene. Other factors may increase a person's risk of gingivitis, including but not limited to systemic conditions such as uncontrolled diabetes mellitus and some medications. The signs and symptoms of gingivitis can be reversed through improved oral hygiene measures and increased plaque disruption. If left untreated, gingivitis has the potential to progress to periodontitis and other related diseases that are more detrimental to periodontal and general health.

== Periodontal diseases ==
Periodontal disease encompasses a number of diseases of the periodontal tissues that result in attachment loss and destruction of alveolar bone.

Periodontal diseases take on many different forms but are usually a result of a coalescence of bacterial plaque biofilm accumulation of the red complex bacteria (e.g. P. gingivalis, T. forsythia, and T. denticola) of the gingiva and teeth, combined with host immuno-inflammatory mechanisms and other risk factors that can lead to destruction of the supporting bone around natural teeth. Untreated, these diseases can lead to alveolar bone loss and tooth loss. As of 2013, periodontal disease accounted for 70.8% of teeth lost in patients with the disease in South Korea. Periodontal disease is the second most common cause of tooth loss (second to dental caries) in Scotland. Twice-daily brushing and flossing are a way to help prevent periodontal diseases.

Healthy gingiva can be described as stippled, pale or coral pink in Caucasian people, with various degrees of pigmentation in other races. The gingival margin is located at the cemento-enamel junction without the presence of pathology. The gingival pocket between the tooth and the gingival should be no deeper than 1–3mm to be considered healthy. There is also the absence of bleeding on gentle probing.

Periodontal diseases can be caused by a variety of factors, the most prominent being dental plaque. Dental plaque forms a bacterial biofilm on the tooth surface; if not adequately removed from the tooth surface in close proximity to the gingiva, a host-microbial interaction gets underway. This results in the imbalance between host and bacterial factors which can in turn result in a change from health to disease. Other local or systemic factors can result in or further progress the manifestation of periodontal disease. Other factors can include age, socio-economic status, oral hygiene education and diet. Systemic factors may include uncontrolled diabetes or tobacco smoking.

Signs and symptoms of periodontal disease: bleeding gums, gingival recession, halitosis (bad breath), mobile teeth, ill-fitting dentures and buildup of plaque and calculus.

Individual risk factors include: gender, smoking and alcohol consumption, diabetes, obesity and metabolic syndrome, osteoporosis and Vitamin D conditions, stress and genetic factors.

== 2018 AAP/EFP classification of periodontal and peri-implant diseases and conditions ==
In 2017, the American Academy of Periodontology (AAP) and the European Federation of Periodontology (EFP) together collaborated to revise and adopt a new classification system for periodontal conditions to aid in a more personalized approach to patient care. In 2018 they released an updated classification system which includes a multi-dimensional staging and grading system for periodontitis classification, a recategorization of various forms of periodontitis, and the inaugural classification for peri-implant diseases and conditions.

=== Periodontal health, gingivitis, and gingival diseases and conditions ===
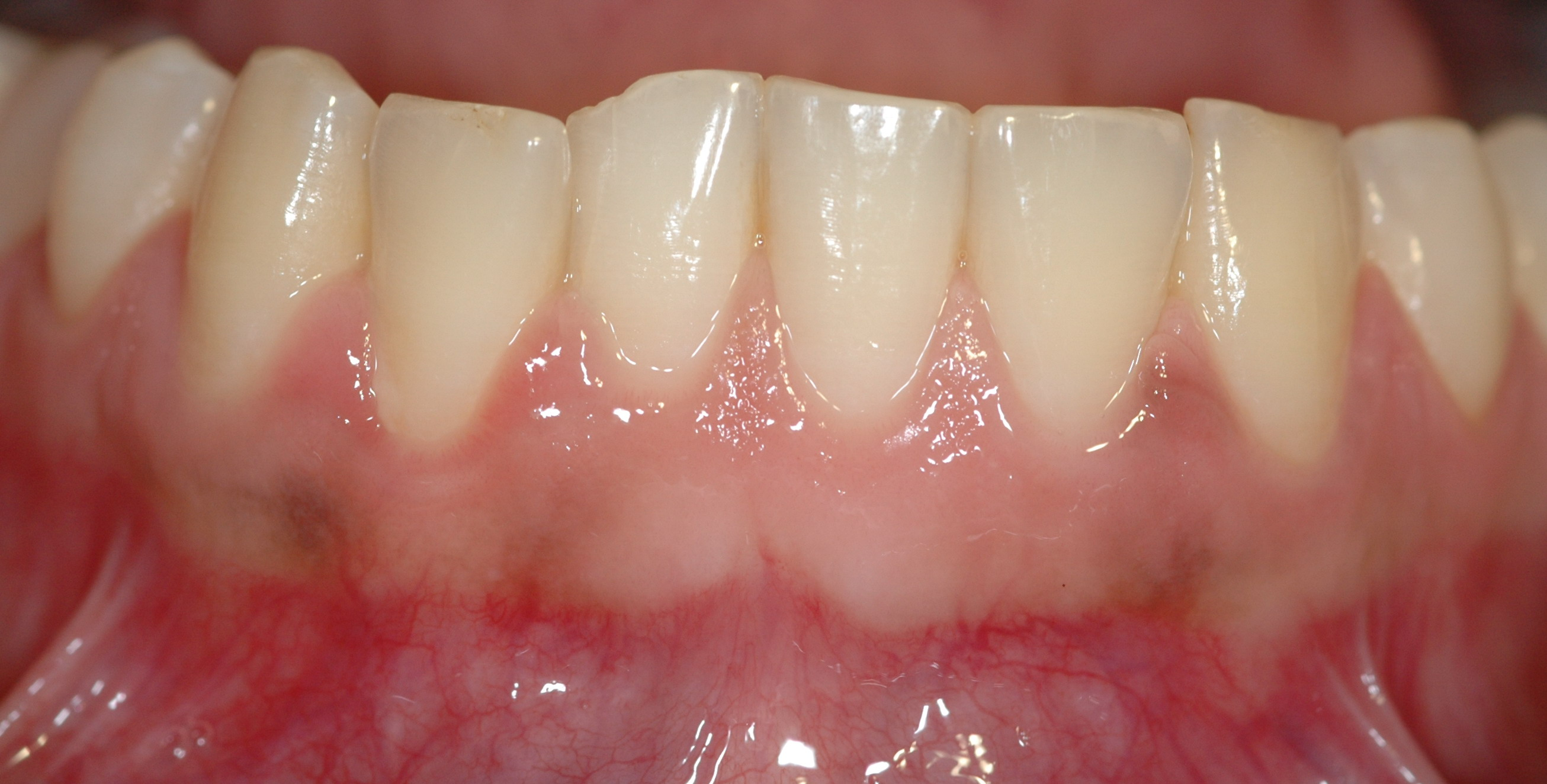
Healthy gingiva

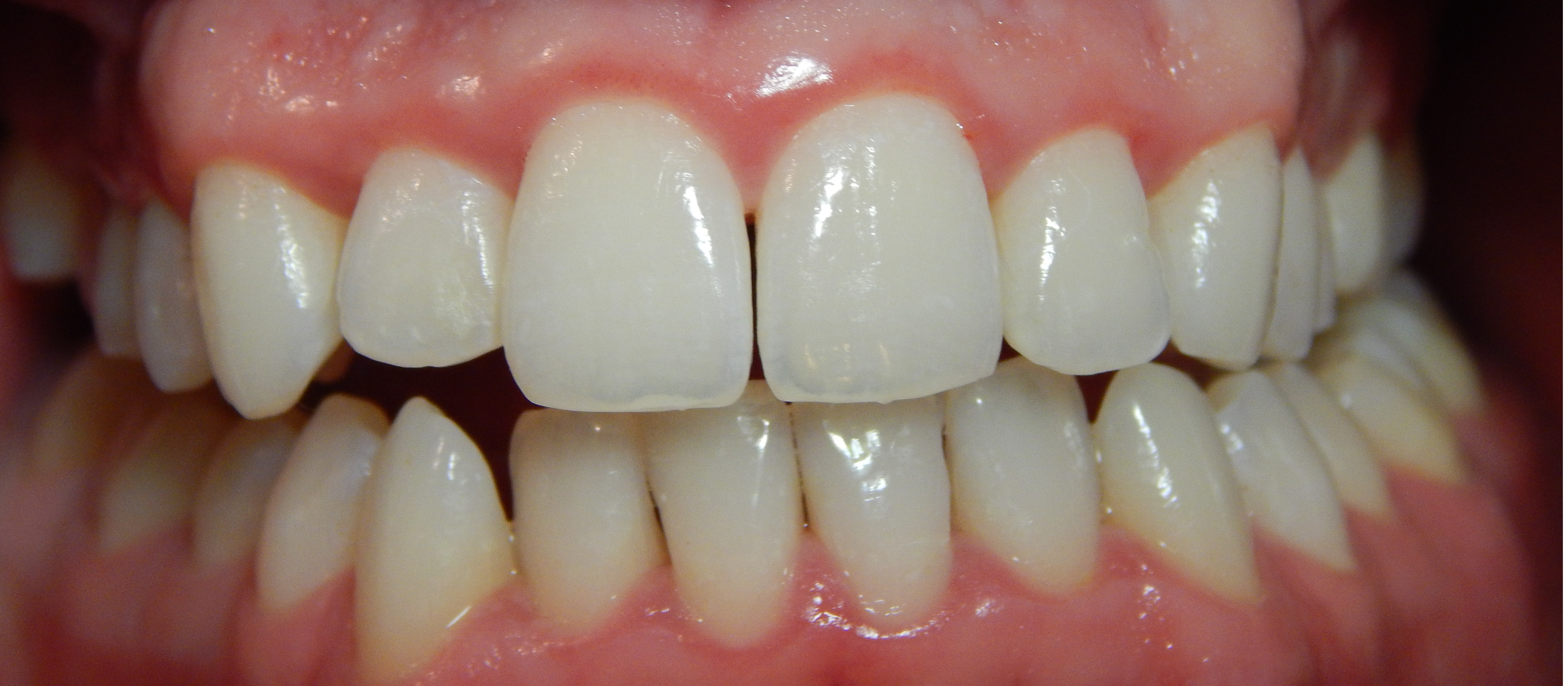
Gingivitis after treatment

The 2018 Disease Classification for periodontal health, gingivitis, and gingival diseases and conditions are outlined in detail below:

1. Periodontal health and gingival health
  1. Clinical gingival health on an intact periodontium
  2. Clinical gingival health on a reduced periodontium
    - Stable periodontitis patient
    - Non-periodontitis patient
2. Gingivitis—dental biofilm-induced
  1. Associated with dental biofilm alone
  2. Medicated by systemic or local risk factors
  3. Drug-influenced gingival enlargement
3. Gingival diseases—nondental biofilm-induced
  1. Genetic or developmental disorders
  2. Specific infections
  3. Inflammatory and immune conditions
  4. Reactive processes
  5. Neoplasms
  6. Endocrine, nutritional, and metabolic diseases
  7. Traumatic lesions
  8. Gingival pigmentation

=== Disease classification for the three major forms of periodontitis ===
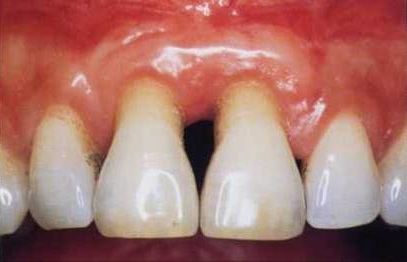
Periodontal recession on maxillary central incisors

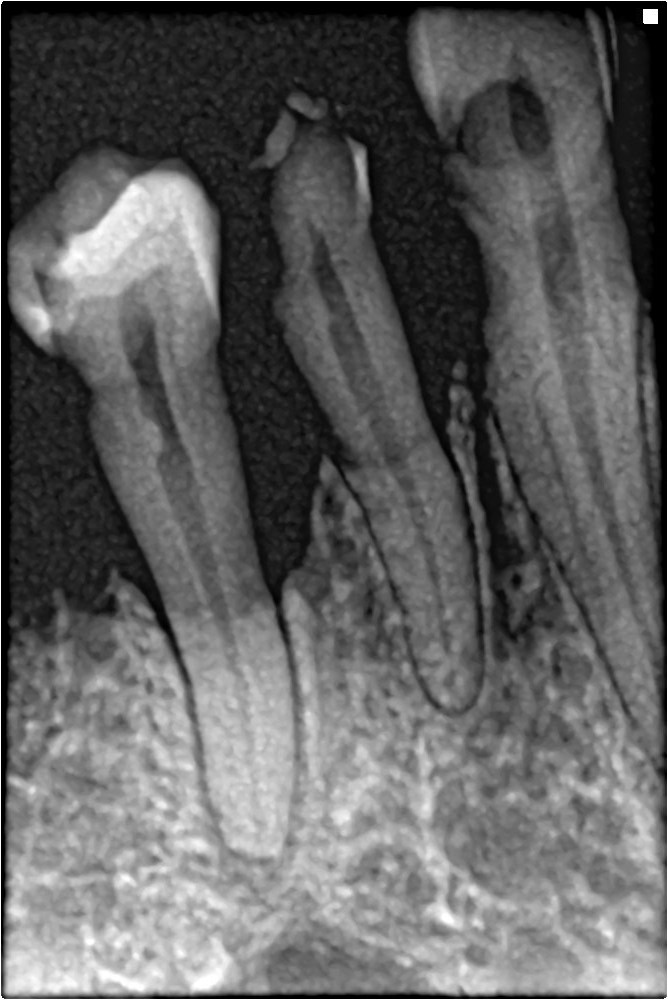
Bone loss in periapical radiograph

The 2018 Disease Classification of Periodontal Diseases and Conditions breaks down the category of periodontitis into three forms and each of these forms are further broken down into two or more subcategories.

1. Necrotizing periodontal diseases
  1. Necrotizing gingivitis
  2. Necrotizing periodontitis
  3. Necrotizing stomatitis
2. Periodontitis as manifestation of systemic diseases – Classification of these conditions should be based on the primary systemic disease according to the International Statistical Classification of Diseases and Related Health Problems (ICD) codes
3. Periodontitis
  1. Stages: Based on severity (Note: Severity: Interdental clinical attachment level at site with greatest loss; Radiographic bone loss and tooth loss.) and complexity of management (Note: Complexity of management; Probing depth, pattern of bone loss, furcation lesions, number of remaining teeth, tooth mobility, ridge defects, masticatory dysfunction.)
    - Stage I: Initial periodontitis
    - Stage II: Moderate periodontitis
    - Stage III: Severe periodontitis with potential for additional tooth loss
    - Stage IV: Severe periodontitis with potential for loss of the dentition
  2. Extent and distribution: (Note: Add to Stage as descriptor: Localized < 30% teeth, generalized > or equal to 30%.) Localized, generalized; molar-incisor distribution
  3. Grades: Evidence or risk of rapid progression, (Note: Anticipated treatment response: case phenotype, smoking, hyperglycemia.) anticipated treatment response (Note: Risk of progression; direct evidence by periapical radiographs of CAL loss, or indirect (bone/age ratio).)
    - Grade A: Slow rate of disease progression
    - Grade B: Moderate rate of disease progression
    - Grade C: Rapid rate of disease progression

=== Other conditions affecting the periodontium ===
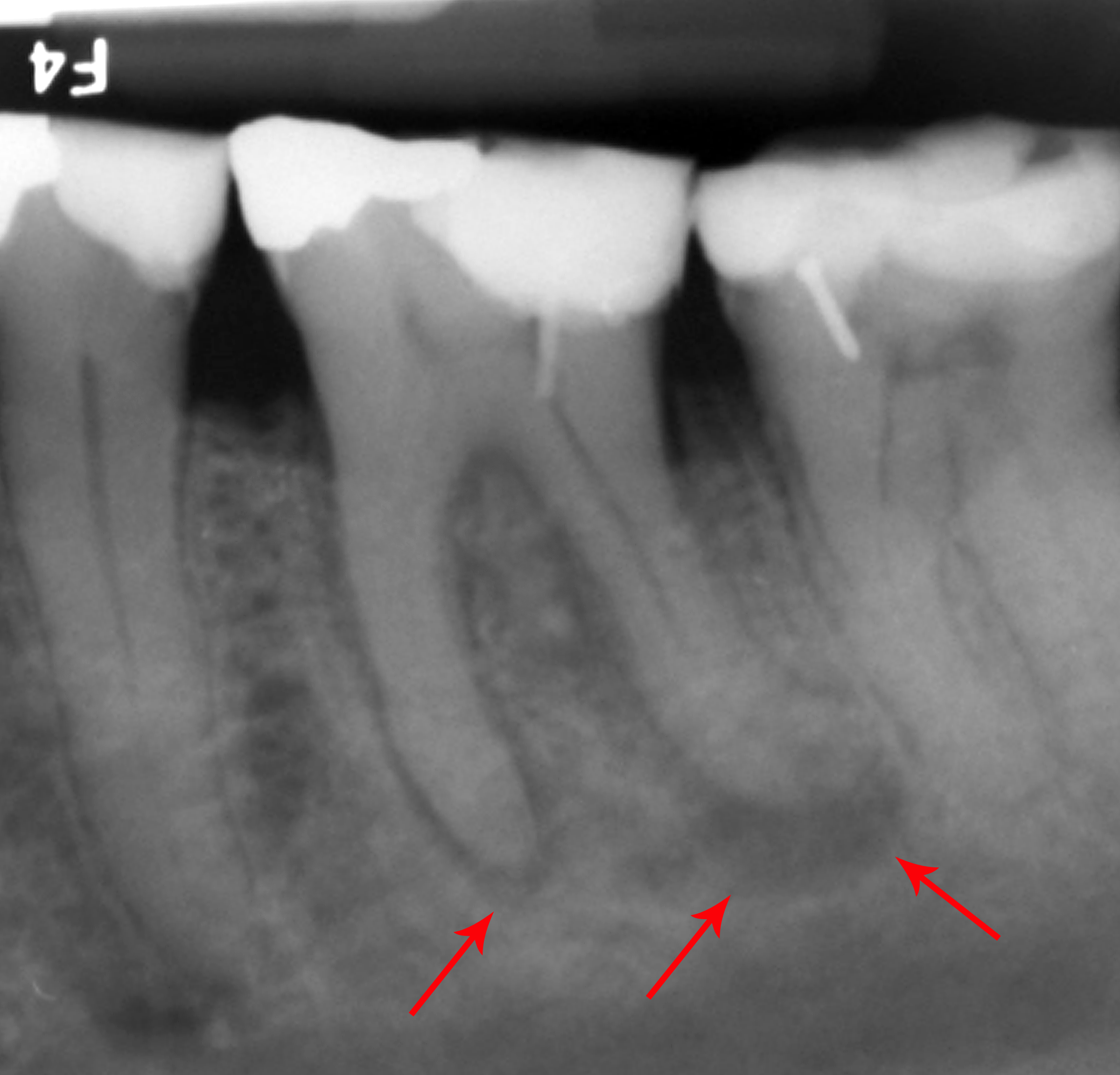
Abscessed tooth periapical radiograph

The 2018 Disease Classification of Periodontal Disease and Conditions contains a category for other conditions that may have an effect upon the health of the periodontium.

1. Systemic diseases or conditions affecting the periodontal supporting tissues
2. Other periodontal conditions
  1. Periodontal abscesses
  2. Endodontic periodontal lesions
3. Mucogingival deformities and conditions around teeth
  1. Gingival phenotype
  2. Gingival/soft tissue recession
  3. Lack of gingiva
  4. Decreased vestibular depth
  5. Aberrant frenum or muscle position
  6. Gingival excess
  7. Abnormal colour
  8. Condition of exposed root surface
4. Traumatic occlusal forces
  1. Primary occlusal trauma
  2. Secondary occlusal trauma
  3. Orthodontic forces
5. Prostheses and tooth-related factors that modify or predispose to plaque-induced gingival diseases/periodontitis
  1. Localized tooth-related factors
  2. Localized dental prostheses-related factors

=== Peri-implant diseases and conditions ===
The 2018 Disease Classification of Periodontal Disease and Conditions divides this category into four subcategories:

- Peri-implant health
- Peri-implant mucositis
- Peri-implantitis
- Peri-implant soft and hard tissue deficiencies

=== Prevention ===
The most effective prevention method is what can be achieved by the patient at home, for example, using the correct tooth brushing technique, interdental cleaning aids such as interdental brushes or floss and using a fluoridated toothpaste. It is also advised that patients receive bi-annual check ups from their dental health provider along with thorough cleaning.

=== Treatment ===
Along with specialist periodontist treatment, a general dentist or dental hygienist can perform routine scale and cleans using either hand instruments or an ultrasonic scaler (or a combination of both). The practitioner can also prescribe specialized plaque-removal techniques (tooth brushing, interdental cleaning). The practitioner can also perform a plaque index to indicate to the patient areas of plaque they are not removing on their own. This can be removed through the procedure of a dental prophylaxis.

== Aetiology ==
The primary aetiological factor for periodontal disease is plaque biofilm of dental biofilm. A dental biofilm is a community of microorganisms attached to a hard, non-shedding surface. In the oral cavity, hard non-shedding surfaces include teeth, dental restorative materials and fixed or removable dental appliance such dentures. It is this adherence to non-shedding surfaces that allows bacteria in a dental biofilm to have unique characteristics of clinical significance. The stages of biofilm formation:

1. Formation of an acquired pellicle: involves selective absorption of salivary and GCF molecules through an electrostatic affinity with hydroxyapatite.
2. Bacterial transportation: bacteria will readily adhere to the acquired pellicle through adhesins, proteins and enzymes within one to two hours.
3. Reversible interaction: there is electrostatic attraction or hydrophobic interaction between microorganisms and the tooth surface.
4. Irreversible interaction: bacterial adhesins recognise specific host receptors such as pili and outer membrane proteins. The different species of bacteria bind together and require specific receptors to interact with the pellicle.
5. Co-adhesion: there is a natural affinity for oral microorganisms to adhere to one another which is termed co‐adhesion. Co-adhesion involves the adherence of planktonic or single culture cells to already attached organisms on a surface. The organisms which make first contact with the surface and allow the platform for later co-adhesion of bacteria are called early colonisers; they facilitate the formation of complex multispecies dental biofilms.
6. Multiplication: through continued growth and maturation of existing plaque micro-organisms and the further recruitment of later colonisers.
7. Climax community (homeostasis): after a prolonged period of stability, the bacterial community has sufficient nutrients and protection to survive. These complex biofilms are usually found in hard to cleanse areas. Nutrition is provided from dietary consumption of the host for supra-gingival biofilm organisms and from blood and GCF for the sub gingival biofilm organisms.
8. Detachment: from one surface to another or within biofilm allows colonization at remote sites.

Bacteria contained within the biofilm are protected by a slimy extracellular polysaccharide matrix which helps to protect them from the outside environment and chemotherapeutics agents. An example of a chemotherapeutic agent is an antiseptic such as chlorhexidine mouth-rinse or antibiotics. Thus, antibiotics are not generally used in the treatment of periodontal disease, unlike other bacterial infections around the body. The most effective way to control the plaque biofilm is via mechanical removal such as toothbrushing, interdental cleaning or periodontal debridement performed by a dental professional.

== Pathogenesis ==
An individual's host response plays an important role in the pathogenesis of periodontal disease. Even in a mouth where the gingiva appear healthy, there is constant low-level inflammatory response facilitated by the host to manage the constant bacterial load of plaque micro-organisms. Leukocytes and neutrophils are the main cells that phagocytose bacteria found in the gingival crevice or pocket. They migrate from the tissues in a specialized exudate called gingival crevicular fluid also known as GCF. Neutrophils are recruited to the gingival crevice area as they are signalled to by molecules released by plaque microorganisms. Damage to epithelial cells releases cytokines which attract leukocytes to assist with the inflammatory response. The balance between normal cell responses and the beginning of gingival disease is when there is too much plaque bacteria for the neutrophils to phagocytose and they degranulate, releasing toxic enzymes that cause tissue damage. This appears in the mouth as red, swollen and inflamed gingiva which may bleed when probed clinically or during tooth brushing. These changes are due to increased capillary permeability and an influx of inflammatory cells into the gingival tissues. When gingival disease remains established and the aetiology is not removed, there is further recruitment of cells such as macrophages, which assist with the phagocytic digestion of bacteria, and lymphocytes, which begin to initiate an immune response. Pro-inflammatory cytokines are produced inside the gingival tissues and further escalate inflammation, which impacts the progression of chronic systemic inflammation and disease. The result is collagen breakdown, infiltrate accumulation as well as collagen breakdown in the periodontal ligament and alveolar bone resorption. At this stage, the disease has progressed from gingivitis to periodontitis and the loss of supporting periodontium structure is irreversible.

== Risk factors ==
A risk factor is a variable that in health can be defined as "a characteristic associated with an increased rate of a subsequently occurring disease". Risk factors are variables that contribute to disease, rather than being factors that induce disease. Risk factors may be seen as modifiable and non-modifiable. Modifiable risk factors are often behavioural in nature and can be changed by the individual or environmental circumstances, whereas non-modifiable factors are usually intrinsic to an individual's genetics and cannot be changed. To determine risk factors for a disease, evidence-based research and studies are needed for evidence, with longitudinal studies giving the most statistically significant outcomes and the best reliability for determining risk factors. Risk factors often coexist with other variables, rarely acting alone to contribute to a disease. Risk factors can be genetic, environmental, behavioural, psychological, and demographic in nature.

There are many risk factors that contribute to placing an individual at higher risk for developing gingival and periodontal diseases. However, the only aetiological factor for periodontal disease is bacterial plaque, or biofilm. Identification of one's risk factors plays an important role in the diagnosis, treatment and management of periodontal diseases. It was previously believed that each human being had the same risk of developing periodontal diseases, but through the identification and classification of risk factors, it has become well understood that each individual will have a differing array of risk factors that generate susceptibility and contribute to severity of periodontal disease.

Individual, modifiable risk factors include:

- Tobacco smoking: tobacco smoking is firmly established as a major risk factor for periodontal disease, with the relationship between smoking exposure and periodontal tissue destruction being supported strongly by various research papers. Smoking decreases the healing abilities of the oral tissues by destroying blood vessels and supply and preventing essential immune-defence organisms from penetrating the tissues. Therefore, pathogenic bacteria are able to destruct the periodontal tissues more rapidly and escalate the severity of disease. Although the clinical signs of inflammation are less pronounced, smokers have a larger portion of sites with deep pocketing depths and loss of clinical attachment when compared with nonsmokers. Smoking cessation and counselling is an integral part of a dental professional's work with periodontal disease patients. Smoking cessation has been proven to prevent progression of periodontal disease and to return the oral microflora to a less pathogenic microbial state.
- Alcohol consumption: more research needs to be conducted in the form of longitudinal studies on the effects of alcohol on the periodontal tissues. However, current studies suggest that alcohol consumption moderately increases one's risk for progression of periodontal disease.
- Diabetes mellitus: diabetes falls under the category of modifiable risk factors as although it cannot be cured, it can be controlled, which greatly helps periodontal disease control. A clear two-way relationship has been established with blood glucose control directly affecting periodontal disease severity and progression, and vice versa. Periodontal disease patients with diabetes mellitus also have poorer healing abilities than those without diabetes, and hence are at an increased risk for more severe diseases if blood glucose control is poor and when healing abilities are affected by systemic disease.
- Obesity and vitamin D deficiency are both risk factors for periodontal disease that go hand in hand. Obesity is generally associated with a decreased consumption of fruits and vegetables, with an increase in foods high in fat, salt and sugar. Having a poor diet not only contributes to obesity but also results in a lack of essential nutrients, including vitamin C, D, and calcium, which all play important roles in ensuring a healthy immune system and healthy oral tissues and bone.
- Poor oral hygiene: as plaque is the only aetiological factor for periodontal disease, poor oral hygiene is the most prominent risk factor in initiating, progressing and determining severity of disease. Performing brushing and interdental cleaning is perhaps one of the most effective ways at removing dental plaque biofilm and prevention of periodontal diseases.
- Cardiovascular disease: not only does poor oral hygiene have a clear relationship with an increased risk of developing cardiovascular disease, high concentrations of cholesterol and the mechanisms of oral bacteria in the process of atherosclerosis may increase in individuals with chronic periodontitis.
- Stress: various studies have demonstrated that individuals under psychological, ongoing chronic stress are more likely to have clinical attachment loss and decreased levels of alveolar bone due to periodontal destruction. This is due to the increased production of certain immune cells and interleukins, which decrease the defensive mechanisms against pathogenic bacteria, therefore increasing chances of developing periodontal disease.
- Pregnancy: studies have shown that the oral tissues are affected and altered during pregnancy due to a decreased immune response and increased vascular blood supply and volume systemically. Pregnancy does not cause gingival and periodontal diseases but may exacerbate the inflammatory response to a pre-existing disease. Also, pregnancy does not detract minerals from the oral tissues or teeth as previously thought. Existing disease often presents during pregnancy due to an altered oral environment, and not merely due to pregnancy causing disease. These effects can be prevented by good oral hygiene through toothbrushing and interdental cleaning.

Non-modifiable risk factors include:

- Genetics and the host response have been shown to play an important role in periodontal disease development in studies on identical twins and isolated indigenous populations. Periodontal disease also may result due to an abnormal or decreased immune response, rather than aggressive properties of bacterial pathogens.
- Osteoporosis: in individuals with osteoporosis, studies have shown that alveolar bone is less dense than in a healthy adult. However, this does not demonstrate a relationship with periodontal pathogens or clinical attachment loss, therefore more research is needed to investigate if osteoporosis is a true risk factor for periodontal disease.
- Drug-induced disorders: many drugs and medications can have an adverse effect on the periodontal tissues, through contributing to various oral conditions such as dry mouth and gingival enlargement (gingival hyperplasia). It is crucial that dental professionals ensure that poly-pharmacy patients have medical history reviewed at each visit to correctly evaluate the patient's risk and determine appropriate course of action for dental treatment.
- Haematological disorders: important cells and nutrients carried in the blood to the periodontal tissues are crucial for the tissues' defence mechanisms and response to toxins and pathogens, gas exchange and efficient hemostasis. Therefore, red blood cells have a pivotal role in maintaining the health of the periodontium, meaning haematological disorders can have profound detriment to the periodontal tissues and the onset of disease.

Risk characteristics must be considered in conjunction with risk factors as variables that may also contribute to increasing or decreasing one's chances of developing periodontal disease. Numerous studies show that age, gender, race, socioeconomic status, education and genetics also have strong relationships on influencing periodontal disease.

Periodontal disease is multifactorial, requiring dental and oral health professionals to have a clear and thorough understanding of the risk factors and their mechanisms in order to implement effective disease management in clinical practice.

== Diagnosis ==
Periodontitis and associated conditions are recognised as a wide range of inflammatory diseases that have unique symptoms and varying consequences. In order to identify disease, classification systems have been used to categorize periodontal and gingival diseases based on their severity, aetiology and treatments. Having a system of classification is necessary to enable dental professionals to give a label to a patient's condition and make a periodontal diagnosis. A diagnosis is reached by firstly undertaking thorough examination of the patient's medical, dental and social histories, to note any predisposing risk factors (see above) or underlying systemic conditions. Then, this is combined with findings from a thorough intra and extra oral examination. Indices such as the periodontal screening record (PSR) and the Community Periodontal Index of Treatment Needs (CPITN) are also used in making a diagnosis and to order or classify the severity of disease.

If disease is identified through this process, then a full periodontal analysis is performed, often by dental hygienists, oral health therapists, or specialist periodontists. This involves full mouth periodontal probing and taking measurements of pocket depths, clinical attachment loss and recession. Along with this other relevant parameters such as plaque, bleeding, furcation involvement and mobility are measured to gain an overall understanding of the level of disease. Radiographs may also be performed to assess alveolar bone levels and levels of destruction.

== Treatment ==
=== Phases of periodontal therapy ===
Contemporary periodontal treatment is designed based on the trimeric model, and is performed in four phases. These phases are structured to ensure that periodontal therapy is conducted in a logical sequence, consequently improving the prognosis of the patient, in comparison to indecisive treatment plan without a clear goal.

==== Phase I therapy (initial therapy – disease control phase) ====
===== Non-surgical phase =====
The non-surgical phase is the initial phase in the sequence of procedures required for periodontal treatment. This phase aims to reduce and eliminate any gingival inflammation by removing dental plaque and calculus, restoration from tooth decay and correction of defective restoration, as these all contribute to gingival inflammation, also known as gingivitis. Phase I consists of treatment of emergencies, antimicrobial therapy, diet control, patient education and motivation, correction of iatrogenic factors, deep caries, hopeless teeth, preliminary scaling, temporary splinting, occlusal adjustment, minor orthodontic tooth movement and debridement.

===== Re-evaluation phase =====
During this phase, patients are seen 3–6 weeks after initial therapy; it is required to re-evaluate the steps carried out after the phase I therapy. Usually 3–6 week re-evaluation is crucial in severe cases of periodontal disease. The elements which are required to be re-evaluated are the results of initial therapy (phase I therapy), oral hygiene and status, bleeding and plaque scores and a review of diagnosis and prognosis and modification of the whole treatment plan if necessary.

==== Phase II therapy (surgical phase) ====
After post-phase I, it is necessary to evaluate the requirement of periodontium for surgery. Factors identifying if the surgical phase is required are: periodontal pocket management in specific situations, irregular bony contours or deep craters, areas of suspected incomplete removal of local deposits, degree II and III furcation involvements, distal areas of last molars with expected mucogingival junction problems, persistent inflammation, root coverage and removal of gingival enlargement.

==== Phase III therapy (restorative phase) ====
During this phase, any defects need to be restored with removable or fixed through dental prosthesis, prosthodontics, or other restoration processes.

==== Phase IV therapy (maintenance phase) ====
The last phase of periodontal therapy requires the preservation of periodontal health. In this phase, patients are required to re-visit through a scheduled plan for maintenance care to prevent any re-occurrence of the disease. The maintenance phase constitutes the long-term success for periodontal treatment, thus contributing to a long relationship between the oral health therapist, dentist, or periodontist and the patient.

==== Periodontal and restorative interface ====
The prognosis of the restorative treatment is determined by the periodontal health. The goals for establishing periodontal health prior to restorative treatment are as follows:

1. Periodontal treatment should be managed to assure the establishment of firm gingival margin prior to tooth preparation for restoration. Absence of bleeding tissue during restorative manipulation provides accessibility and aesthetic outcome.
2. Certain periodontal treatment is formulated to increase sufficient tooth length for retention. Failure to accomplish these methods prior restorations can lead to the complexity or risk of failure of treatment such as impression making, tooth preparation and restoration.
3. Periodontal therapy should follow restorative method as the resolution of gingival inflammation may result in the repositioning of teeth or in soft tissue and mucosal changes.

=== Standard of periodontal treatment ===
Non-surgical therapy is the golden standard of periodontal therapy which consists of debridement with a combination of oral-hygiene instructions and patient motivation. It mainly focuses on the elimination and reduction of putative pathogens and shifting the microbial flora to a favourable environment to stabilize periodontal disease. Debridement is thorough mechanical removal of calculus and dental biofilm from the root surfaces of the tooth. Debridement is the basis of treatment for inflammatory periodontal diseases and remains the golden standard for surgical and non-surgical treatment in the initial therapy. It is conducted by hand instrumentation such as curettes or scalers and ultrasonic instrumentation. It requires a few appointments, depending on time and clinician skills, for effective removal of supragingival and subgingival calculus, when periodontal pockets are involved. It can assist in periodontal healing and reduce periodontal pocketing by changing the subgingival ecological environment. Prevention of periodontal disease and maintenance of the periodontal tissues following initial treatment requires the patient's ability to perform and maintain effective dental plaque removal. This requires the patient to be motivated in improving their oral hygiene and requires behaviour change in terms of tooth brushing, interdental cleaning, and other oral hygiene techniques. Personal oral hygiene is often considered an essential aspect of controlling chronic periodontitis. Research has shown that it is important to appreciate the motivation of the patient behaviour changes that have originated from the patient. Patients must want to improve their oral hygiene and feel confident that they have the skills to do so. It is crucial for the clinician to encourage patient changes and to educate the patient appropriately. Motivational interviewing is a good technique to ask open-ended questions and express empathy towards the patient.

== Role of the oral health therapist ==
An oral health therapist is a member of the dental team who is dual-qualified as a dental hygienist and dental therapist. They work closely with dentists and a number of dental specialists including periodontists. It is common for the oral health therapist to be involved in the treatment of gingival and periodontal diseases for patients. Their scope of practice in this area includes oral health assessment, diagnosis, treatment and maintenance and referral where necessary. They also have expertise in providing oral health education and promotion to support the patient to maintain their at-home oral care. Oral health therapists are employed by the dental team to share the responsibilities of care. They are an important asset as they have been uniquely and specifically trained in preventative dentistry and risk minimization. This allows the dental team to work more competently and effectively as dentists can manage more complex treatments or significantly medically compromised patients.

== Periodontist ==
A periodontist is a specialist dentist who treats patients for periodontal-related diseases and conditions. They are involved in the prevention, diagnosis and treatment of periodontal disease. Periodontists receive further specialist training in periodontics after completing a dental degree. Periodontists provide treatments for patients with severe gingival diseases or complex medical histories. Periodontists offer a wide range of treatments including root scaling and planing, periodontal surgery, implant surgery and other complex periodontal procedures.

Dental implant

List of procedures performed by a periodontist:

- non-surgical treatments
- gum graft surgery
- laser treatment
- regenerative procedures
- dental crown lengthening
- dental implants
- pocket reduction procedures
- plastic surgery procedures

== Training ==
Before applying to any postgraduate training program in periodontology, one must first complete a dental degree.

=== Canada ===
Canadian programs are accredited by the Commission on Dental Accreditation of Canada and are a minimum of three years in length and usually culminate with a master (MSc or MDent) degree. Graduates are then eligible to sit for the fellowship exams with the Royal College of Dentists of Canada. Dentistry is a regulated profession. To become a licensed dentist in Canada one must have a BDS, DDS, or DMD degree and be certified by the National Dental Examining Board of Canada.

=== United States ===
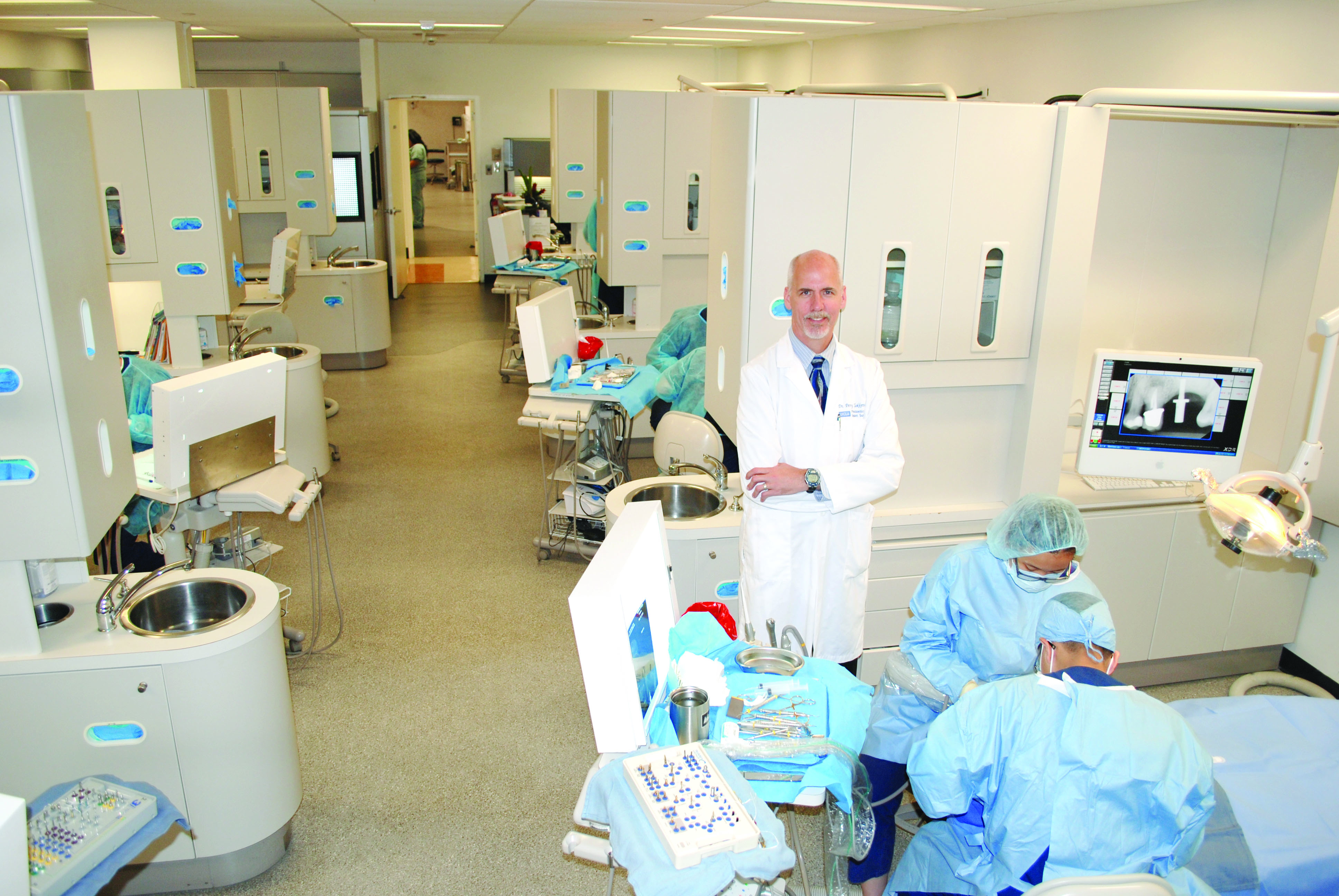
UCLA School of Dentistry periodontics graduate clinic

The American Dental Association (ADA)-accredited programs are a minimum of three years in length. According to the American Academy of Periodontology, U.S.-trained periodontists are specialists in the prevention, diagnosis and treatment of periodontal diseases and oral inflammation, and in the placement and maintenance of dental implants. Many periodontists also diagnose and treat oral pathology. Historically, periodontics served as the basis for the speciality of oral medicine. Following successful completion of post-graduate training a periodontist becomes board-eligible for the American Board of Periodontology examination.

== Maintenance ==
After periodontal treatment, whether it be surgical or non-surgical, maintenance periodontal therapy is essential for a long-term result and stabilization of periodontal disease. There is also a difference in the maintenance of different types of periodontal disease, as there are different types, such as:

=== Gingivitis ===
The reversible inflammation of the gums is easily prevented by patients. After the removal of the inflammatory product, usually plaque or calculus, this allows the gums room to heal. This is done by patients thoroughly cleaning teeth every day with a soft bristle toothbrush and an interdental aid. This can be floss, interdental brushes, or whatever is preferred by the patient. Without patient compliance and constant removal of plaque and calculus, gingivitis cannot be treated completely and can progress to irreversible periodontitis.

=== Necrotizing ulcerative gingivitis (NUG) ===
Also acute necrotizing ulcerative gingivitis and necrotizing ulcerative periodontitis, it is a type of periodontal disease different than many other periodontal diseases. Clinical characteristics include gingival necrosis (breakdown of the gums), gingival pain, bleeding, halitosis (bad breath), as well as a grey colour to the gingiva and a punched out appearance. It is treated through debridement, usually under local anaesthetic due to immense pain. To maintain and treat the condition completely, a chlorhexidine mouthwash should be recommended to the patient to use twice daily, oral health instruction should be provided (using a soft bristle toothbrush or electric toothbrush twice a day) and an interdental cleaning aid, such as floss or interdental brushes, which cleans the areas that the toothbrush cannot reach. The patient should also be educated on proper nutrition and diet and healthy fluid intake. Smoking cessation should occur not only to completely eradicate the disease but also for the health of the patient. Pain control can be done through ibuprofen or paracetamol/acetaminophen. In the case of an immunocompromised patient, antibiotics should be prescribed. Assessment of treatment should be done after 24 hours of treatment and continued every 3–6 months until signs and symptoms are resolved and gingival health and function restored.

=== Chronic periodontitis ===
The inflammation of the gums and irreversible destruction of the alveolar bone and surrounding structures of the teeth, which is usually slow progressing but can have bursts. Local factors explain presence of disease, such as diet, lack of oral hygiene, plaque accumulation, smoking, etc. It is characterized by pocket formation and recession of the gingiva (shrinkage of the gums). Treatment and maintenance are important in stopping disease progression and to resolve the inflammation. Treatment usually consists of scaling and root planning, surgical therapy, and regenerative surgical therapy. After treatment, patient care and regular maintenance check-ups are important to completely eradicate the disease and present its recurrence. This is done through plaque control and removal: twice daily toothbrushing and daily interdental cleaning; chlorhexidine mouthwash can also be effective. The patient should also present to a dentist for maintenance check-ups at least every three months for an in-office check-up and if necessary, plaque control.

== See also ==
- Bone grafting
- Gingival graft
- Periodontitis
- Sinus lift
