= List of periodontal diseases =

Periodontal pathology
- Other names: Gum diseases, periodontal diseases
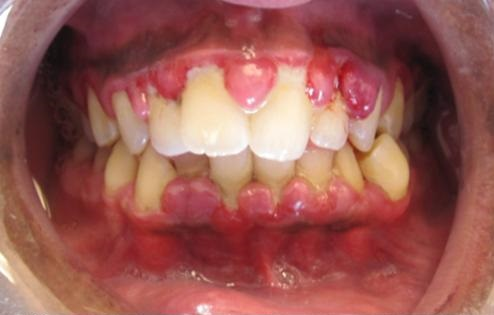
- Gingival enlargement can be a feature in some periodontal diseases.
- Specialty: Dentistry

Periodontal pathology, also termed gum diseases or periodontal diseases, are diseases involving the periodontium (the tooth supporting structures, i.e. the gums). The periodontium is composed of alveolar bone, periodontal ligament, cementum and gingiva.

== Classification ==
An internationally agreed classification formulated at the World Workshop in Clinical Periodontics in 1989 divided periodontal diseases into 5 groups: adult periodontitis, early-onset periodontitis, periodontitis associated with systemic disease, necrotizing ulcerative periodontitis and refractory periodontitis.

In 1993 at the 1st European Workshop in Periodontology the earlier classification was simplified and the categories periodontitis associated with systemic disease and refractory periodontitis were dropped. Both of these classification systems were widely used in clinical and research settings. However, they failed to address a gingival disease component, had overlapping categories with unclear classification criteria and over focussed on age of onset and rate of disease progression.

Consequently, a new classification was developed at the International Workshop for a Classification of Periodontal Diseases and Conditions in 1999. This covered in much more detail the full range of periodontal diseases. "Adult periodontitis" was reclassified "chronic periodontitis" and "early-onset periodontitis" to "aggressive periodontitis". This article follows the 1999 classification, although the ICD-10 (10th revision of the International Statistical Classification of Diseases and Related Health Problems) differs significantly.

The latest World Workshop on the Classification of Periodontal and Peri-Implant Diseases and Conditions was held in 2017. this updated classification overcomes some of the limitations of its predecessors, including:

- Defining the threshold between periodontal health and gingivitis
- Introducing reduced periodontium to the classification to take into account patients with loss of attachment in the absence of periodontitis and post-periodontal treatment
- Introduction of staging and grading system to categorise periodontitis by the severity and biological features instead of the old terms of "chronic periodontitis" and "aggressive periodontitis"
- Introduction of "Systemic Diseases" and Conditions Affecting the Periodontal Supporting Tissues"
- A new classification for peri-implant health, peri-implant mucositis and peri-implantitis.

== Gingival diseases ==
Generally all gingival diseases share common features such as signs and symptoms being restricted to gingiva, clinically detectable inflammation, and the potential for the gum tissues to return to a state of health once the cause is removed, without irreversible loss of attachment of the teeth.

=== Dental plaque-induced ===
Dental plaque-induced gingival diseases

Gingivitis associated with dental plaque only

- without other local contributing factors
- with local contributing factors

Gingival diseases modified by systemic factors

- associated with the endocrine system
1. puberty-associated gingivitis
2. menstrual cycle-associated gingivitis
3. pregnancy-associated
  1. pregnancy-associated gingivitis
  2. pyogenic granuloma ("pregnancy epulis")
4. diabetes mellitus-associated gingivitis
- associated with blood dyscrasias
1. leukemia-associated gingivitis
2. other

Gingival diseases modified by medications

- drug-influenced gingival diseases
1. drug-influenced gingival enlargements
2. drug-influenced gingivitis
  1. oral contraceptive-associated gingivitis
  2. other

Gingival diseases modified by malnutrition

- ascorbic acid deficiency gingivitis (scurvy)
- other

Dental plaque is a microbial biofilm which forms on teeth. This biofilm may calcify and harden, termed calculus (tartar). Plaque tends to build up around the gingival margin (the gumline) and in gingival crevices or periodontal pocket (below the gumline). The release of waste products from the bacteria living in the biofilm causes an inflammatory response in the gums which become red and swollen, bleeding easily when disturbed. This is termed plaque-induced gingivitis and represents the most common form of gingival disease. This inflammatory response in the host can be strongly influenced by many factors such as hormonal fluctuations, drugs, systemic diseases, and malnutrition; which may allow further subdivision of plaque-induced gingivitis (see table).

=== Non-plaque-induced ===
These are far less common than plaque-induced gingival lesions. Non-plaque-induced gingival disease is an inflammation of the gingiva that does not result from dental plaque, but from other gingival diseases caused by bacterial, viral, fungal, or genetic sources. Although this gingival disease is less common than those which are plaque-induced, it can have a serious impact on the patient's overall health. Inflammation can also be caused by allergic reactions to materials used in dental restorations, specific toothpastes, mouthwashes, and even some foods. Trauma, reactions to foreign bodies, or toxic reactions can also contribute to this non-plaque-induced gingivitis. Furthermore, genetics can play a significant role. Specifically, hereditary gingival fibromatosis is known to cause non-plaque-induced gingival lesions. However, sometimes, there is no specific cause for this form of gingival disease.

==== Specific bacterial origin ====
Plaque is composed of a complex community of many different species of bacteria. However, specific bacterial species are recognized as being capable of causing gingival disease in isolation. Neisseria gonorrhoeae and Treponema pallidum, the causative organisms in the sexually transmitted diseases gonorrhea and syphilis may cause gingival lesions. These lesions may appear as a result of systemic infection or direct infection. Streptococcal species may rarely cause gingivitis (with or without involvement of other oral mucosal surfaces), which presents as fever, malaise and very painful, swollen red and bleeding gums, sometimes following tonsillitis.

==== Viral origin ====
The most common viral infections causing gingival lesions are herpes simplex virus type 1 and 2, and varicella-zoster virus. Typically gingival lesions appear as a manifestation of recurrence of a latent viral infection.

==== Fungal origin ====
Sometimes fungal infections occur on the gums. Candida species such as C. albicans, C. glabrata, C. krusei, C. tropicalis, C. parapsilosis, and C. guillermondiiare the most common fungi capable of causing gingival lesions. Linear gingival erythema is classified as a candida-associated lesion, that is to say Candida species are involved, and in some cases the lesion responds to antifungal therapy, but it is thought that other factors exist, such as oral hygiene and human herpesviruses. Linear gingival erythema presents as a localized or generalized, linear band of erythematous (red) gingivitis. It was first observed in HIV infected individuals and termed "HIV-gingivitis", but the condition is not confined to this group. This condition can develop into necrotizing ulcerative periodontitis. Histoplasma capsulatum is the causative organism in histoplasmosis, which may occasionally involve the gums.

==== Genetic origin ====
Hereditary gingival fibromatosis is the main example of a genetic disease causing gingival lesions. There is fibrous enlargement of the gums which may completely cover the teeth and interfere with the normal eruption of teeth in growing children.

==== Manifestations of systemic conditions ====
Occasionally systemic conditions may be the sole cause of gingival inflammation rather than merely influencing background plaque-induced gingivitis. Certain mucocutaneous produce gingival inflammation which may manifest as desquamative gingivitis or oral ulceration. Such conditions include lichen planus, pemphigoid, pemphigus vulgaris, erythema multiforme, and lupus erythematosus. Allergic reactions may also trigger gingival lesions. Sources of allergens include toothpastes, mouthwash, chewing gum, foods, additives, medicines, dental restorative materials, mercury, nickel and acrylic, acrylic. Plasma cell gingivitis is a rare condition thought to be a hypersensitivity reaction. Lichenoid lesions may also occur on the gingival mucosa.

==== Traumatic lesions ====
Trauma may be chemical, physical or thermal. It can be self-inflicted (factitious), iatrogenic or accidental.

==== Foreign body reactions ====
Foreign body reactions appear as red or red and white, possibly painful longstanding lesions similar to desquamative gingivitis, or be granulomatous or lichenoid in nature. Tiny particles of dental materials (e.g. abrasive polishing pastes) may become impregnated in the gingival tissues and trigger a chronic inflammatory cell response.

== Periodontitis ==
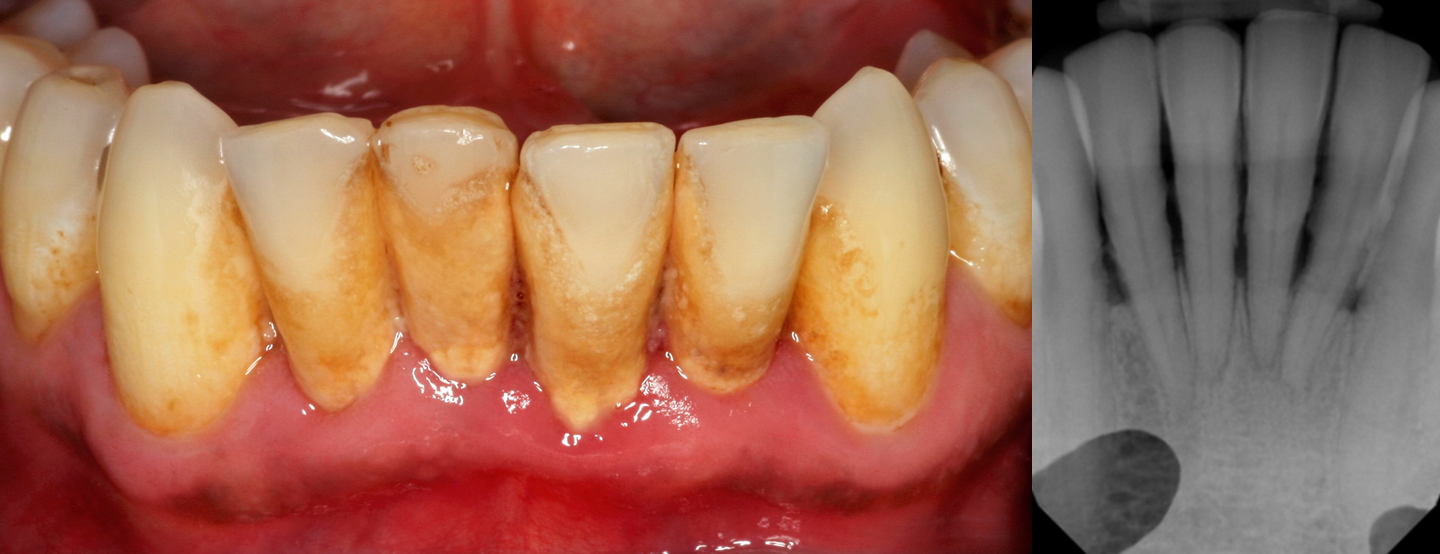
Photograph (left) and a radiograph (right) demonstrating extensive bone loss and soft tissue inflammation due to periodontitis. Plaque, calculus and staining

The defining feature of periodontitis is connective tissue attachment loss which may manifest as deepening of periodontal pockets, gingival recession, or both. This loss of support for the teeth is essentially irreversible damage. Chronic periodontitis is generally slow to moderate in terms of disease progression, although short bursts of increased tissue destruction may occur. Ultimately, tooth loss may occur if the condition is not halted. It is termed localized when less than 30% of sites around teeth are involved, and generalised when more than 30% are involved. clinical attachment loss can be used to determine the severity of the condition, where 1–2 mm is slight, 3–4 mm is moderate and more than 5mm is severe.

== Aggressive periodontitis ==
Aggressive periodontitis is distinguished from the chronic form mainly by the faster rate of progression. Loss of attachment may progress despite good oral hygiene and in the absence of risk factors such as smoking. Aggressive periodontitis may occur in younger persons and there may a genetic aspect, with the trait sometimes running in families.

== Manifestation of systemic diseases ==
Systemic diseases may be associated with the development of periodontitis. It is thought that the host immune response to plaque is altered by the systemic condition. Hematological disorders associated with periodontitis include acquired neutropenia, leukemias and others. Genetic disorders potentially associated include familial and cyclic neutropenia, Down syndrome, leukocyte adhesion deficiency syndromes, Papillon–Lefèvre syndrome, Chédiak–Higashi syndrome, histiocytosis syndromes, glycogen storage disease, infantile genetic agranulocytosis, Cohen syndrome, Ehlers–Danlos syndrome (Types IV and VIII), hypophosphatasia, and others.

== Necrotizing periodontal diseases ==
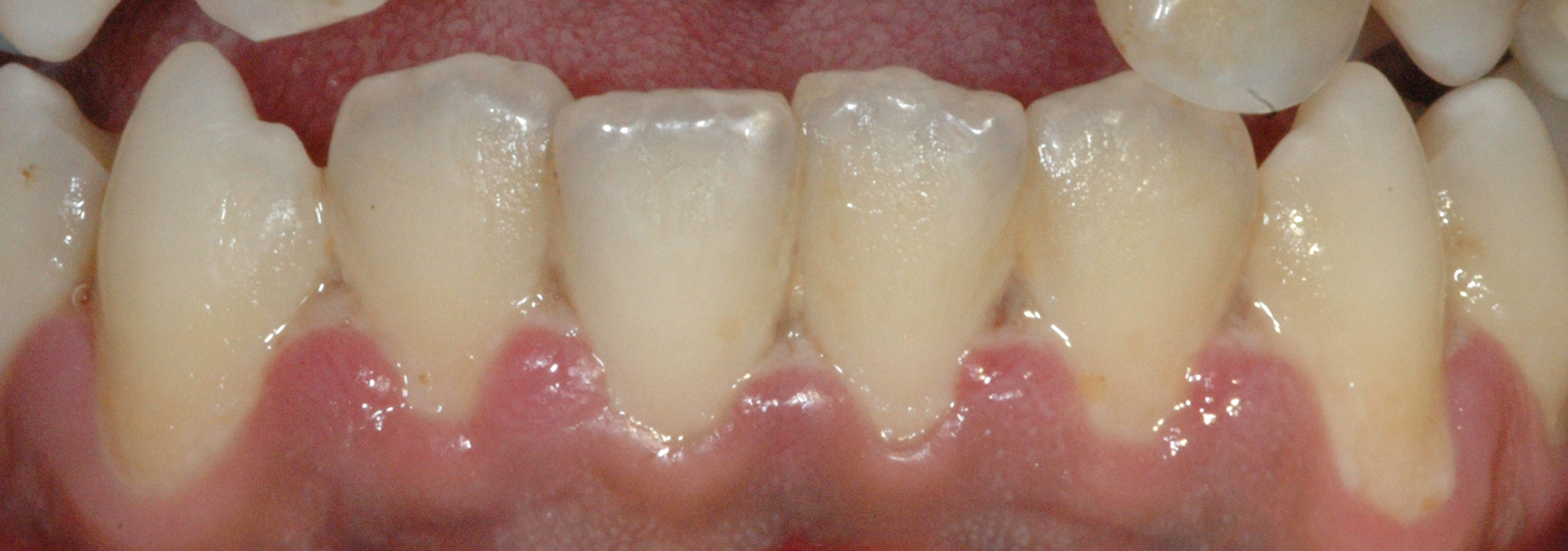
Acute necrotizing ulcerative gingivitis: painful, bleeding, sloughing ulceration and loss of the interdental papillae (usually of the lower front teeth)

Necrotizing periodontal diseases are non-contagious infections but may occasionally occur in epidemic-like patterns due to shared risk factors. The milder form, necrotizing ulcerative gingivitis (also termed "trench mouth"), is characterized by painful, bleeding gums and ulceration and necrosis of the interdental papilla. There may also be intra-oral halitosis, cervical lymphadenitis (swollen lymph nodes in the neck) and malaise. Predisposing factors include psychological stress, sleep deprivation, poor oral hygiene, smoking, immunosuppression and/or malnutrition. Necrotizing ulcerative periodontitis (NUP) is where the infection leads to attachment loss, and involves only the gingiva, periodontal ligament and alveolar ligament. Progression of the disease into tissue beyond the mucogingival junction characterizes necrotizing stomatitis (cancrum oris).

== Abscesses ==
An abscess is a localized collection of pus which forms during an acute infection. The important difference between a periapical abscess and abscesses of the periodontium are that the latter do not arise from pulp necrosis. Abscesses of the periodontium are categorized as gingival abscess, periodontal abscess and pericoronal abscess. Combined periodontic-endodontic lesions may sometimes be abscesses, but these are considered in a separate category. A gingival abscess involves only the gingiva near the marginal gingiva or the interdental papilla. A periodontal abscess involves a greater dimension of the gum tissue, extending apically and adjacent to a periodontal pocket. A pericoronal abscess may occur during an acute episode of pericoronitis in the soft tissue surrounding the crown of a partially or fully erupted tooth, usually around a partially erupted and impacted mandibular third molar (lower wisdom tooth). Periodontal abscesses are the 3rd most common dental emergency, occurring either as acute exacerbation of untreated periodontitis, or as a complication of supportive periodontal therapy. Periodontal abscesses may also arise in the absence of periodontitis, caused by impaction of foreign bodies or root abnormalities.

== Associated with endodontic lesions ==
Often a tooth and surrounding periodontium will exhibit both pulpal and periodontal pathology. Either a periapical lesion becomes continuous with a periodontal lesion, or vice versa.

== Developmental or acquired conditions ==
Developmental or acquired deformities and conditions

Localized tooth-related factors that modify or predispose to plaque-induced gingival diseases/periodontitis

- Tooth anatomic factors
- Dental restorations/appliances
- Root fractures
- Cervical root resorption and cemental tears

Mucogingival deformities and conditions around teeth

- Gingival/soft tissue recession
1. facial or lingual surfaces
2. interproximal (papillary)
- Lack of keratinized gingiva
- Decreased vestibular depth
- Aberrant frenum/muscle position
- Gingival excess
1. pseudopocket
2. inconsistent gingival margin
3. excessive gingival display
4. gingival enlargement
5. Abnormal color

Mucogingival deformities and conditions on edentulous ridges

- Vertical and/or horizontal ridge deficiency
- Lack of gingiva/keratinized tissue
- Gingival/soft tissue enlargement
- Aberrant frenum/muscle position
- Decreased vestibular depth
- Abnormal color

Occlusal trauma

- Primary occlusal trauma
- Secondary occlusal trauma

The presence of certain developmental or acquired conditions can influence the outcome of periodontitis (see table).

== Transition from plaque induced gingivitis to periodontitis ==
Plaque-induced gingivitis and the more severe stage plaque induced periodontitis are the most common of the periodontal diseases. While in some individuals gingivitis never progresses to periodontitis, periodontitis is always preceded by gingivitis.

In 1976, Page & Schroeder introduced an innovative new analysis of periodontal disease based on histopathologic and ultrastructural features of the diseased gingival tissue. Although this new classification does not correlate with clinical signs and symptoms and is admittedly "somewhat arbitrary," it permits a focus of attention pathologic aspects of the disease that were, until recently, not well understood. This new classification divided plaque-induced periodontal lesions into four stages, namely, initial lesion, early lesion, established lesion and advanced lesion.

=== Initial lesion ===
Unlike most regions of the body, the oral cavity is perpetually populated by pathogenic microorganisms; because there is a constant challenge to the mucosa in the form of these microorganisms and their harmful products, it is difficult to truly characterize the boundary between health and disease activity in the periodontal tissues. The oral cavity contains over 500 different microorganisms. It is very hard to distinguish exactly which periodontal pathogen is causing the breakdown of tissues and bone. As such, the initial lesion is said to merely reflect "enhanced levels of activity" of host response mechanisms "normally operative within the gingival tissues."

Healthy gingiva are characterized by small numbers of leukocytes migrating towards the gingival sulcus and residing in the junctional epithelium. Sparse lymphocytes, and plasma cells in particular, may exist just after exiting small blood vessels deep within the underlying connective tissue of the soft tissue between teeth. There is, however, no tissue damage, and the presence of such cells is not considered to be an indication of a pathologic change. When looking at the gums they look knife like and a very light pink or coral pink.

On the contrary, the initial lesion shows increased capillary permeability with "very large numbers" of neutrophils migrating from the dilated gingival plexus into the junctional epithelium and underlying connective tissue (yet remaining within the confines of the region of the sulcus) and macrophages and lymphocytes may also appear. Loss of perivascular collagen occurs; it is thought that this is due to the degradative enzymes released by extravasating leukocytes, such that the collagen and other connective tissue fibers surrounding blood vessels in the area dissolve. When this occurs the gums will appear bright red and either bulbous or rounded, from all the excess fluid building up in the infected area.

The initial lesion appears within two to four days of gingival tissue being subjected to plaque accumulation. When not generated through clinical experimentation, the initial lesion may not appear at all, and instead, a detectable infiltrate similar to that of the early lesion, explained below, appears.

Features of the Initial Lesion:

- Vasculitis of vessels subjacent to junctional epithelium
- Increased migration of leukocytes into junctional epithelium
- Extravascular presence of serum proteins, especially fibrin
- Alteration of the most coronal portion of junctional epithelium
- Loss of perivascular collagen

=== Early lesion ===
While the early lesion is not entirely distinct from the initial lesion, it is said to encompass the inflammatory changes that occur from days four to seven after plaque accumulation has commenced. It is characterized by a matured leukocytic infiltrate that features mainly lymphocytes. Immunoblasts are quite common in the area of infiltration, while plasma cells, if present, are only at the edges of the area. The early lesion can occupy up to 15% of the connective tissue of the marginal gingiva and up to 60–70% of collagen may be dissolved.

Fibroblasts appear altered, exhibiting electron-lucent nuclei, swollen mitochondria, vacuolization of the rough endoplasmic reticulum and rupture of their cell membranes, appearing up to three times the size of normal fibroblasts and found in association with moderately-sized lymphocytes.

The early lesion displays acute exudative inflammation; exudative components and crevicular lymphocytes reach their maximum levels between days 6–12 after plaque accumulates and gingival inflammation commences with the quantity of crevicular fluid being proportional to the size of the reaction site within the underlying connective tissue. The junctional epithelium may even become infiltrated with enough leukocytes so that it resembles a microabscess.

Features of the Early Lesion:

- Accentuation of features of the initial lesion, such as the considerably greater loss of collagen
- Accumulation of lymphocytes subjacent to junctional epithelium
- Cytopathic alterations in resident fibroblasts
- Preliminary proliferation of basal cells of junctional epithelium

=== Established lesion ===
The hallmark of the established lesion is the overwhelming presence of plasma cells in relation to the prior stages of inflammation. Beginning two to three weeks after first plaque formation, the established lesion is widespread in both human and animals populations and can be seen commonly associated with the placement of orthodontic bands on molars.

Similar to the initial and early lesions, the established lesion features an inflammatory reaction confined to the area near the base of the gingival sulcus, but unlike prior stages, displays plasma cells clustered around blood vessels and between collagen fibers outside the immediate area of the reaction site. While most of the plasma cells produce IgG, a significant number do produce IgA (and rarely, some produce IgM). The presence of complement and antigen-antibody complexes is evident throughout the connective and epithelial tissue.

It is in the established lesion that epithelial proliferation and apical migration begin. In health, the junctional epithelium creates the most coronal attachment of the gum tissue to the tooth at or near the cementoenamel junction. In the established lesion of periodontal disease, the connective tissue lying subjacent to the junctional epithelium is nearly destroyed, failing to properly support the epithelium and buttress it against the tooth surface. In response to this, the junctional epithelium proliferates and grows into the vacant underlying spaces, effectively causing the level of its attachment to migrate towards apically, revealing more tooth structure than is normally evident supragingivally (above the level of the gumline) in health.

While many established lesions continue to the advanced lesion (below), most either remain as established lesions for decades or indefinitely; the mechanisms behind this phenomenon are not well understood.

Features of the Established Lesion:

- Predominance of plasma cells without bone loss
- Presence of extravascular immunoglobulins in the connective tissue and junctional epithelium
- Continuing loss of collagen
- Proliferation, apical migration and lateral extension of the junctional epithelium, with or without pocket formation

=== Advanced lesion ===
Many of the features of the advanced lesion are described clinically rather than histologically:

- Periodontal pocket formation
- Gingival ulceration and suppuration
- Destruction of the alveolar bone and periodontal ligament
- Tooth mobility, drifting and eventual loss

Because bone loss makes its first appearance in the advanced lesion, it is equated with periodontitis, while the first three lesions are classified as gingivitis in levels of increasing severity.

The advanced lesion is no longer localized to the area around the gingival sulcus but spreads apically as well as laterally around a tooth and perhaps even deep into the gum tissue papilla. There is a dense infiltrate of plasma cells, other lymphocytes and macrophages. The clusters of perivascular plasma cells still appears from the established lesion. Bone is resorbed, producing scarring and fibrous change.

Features of the Advanced Lesion:

- Extension of the lesion into alveolar bone, periodontal ligament with significant bone loss
- Continued loss of collagen
- Cytopathic alterations in plasma cells in the absence of altered fibroblasts
- Formation of periodontal pocketing
- Conversion of bone marrow into fibrous connective tissue

== History ==
Investigation into the causes and characteristics of periodontal diseases began in the 18th century with pure clinical observation, and this remained the primary form of investigation well into the 19th century. During this time, the signs and symptoms of periodontal diseases were firmly established. Rather than a single disease entity, periodontal disease is a combination of multiple disease processes that share a common clinical manifestation. The cause includes both local and systemic factors. The disease consists of a chronic inflammation associated with loss of alveolar bone. Advanced disease features include pus and exudates. Essential aspects of successful treatment of periodontal disease include initial debridement and maintenance of proper oral hygiene.

The advent of microscopy allowed later studies performed at the turn of the 19th century to report the histological structures and features of periodontal lesions, but most were limited to advanced stages of the disease. High correlation with protozoa Entamoeba gingivalis and Trichomonas tenax was then established. Progress in microscopy in the 1960s, such as advances in histopathology and stereology, allowed researchers to focus on earlier stages of inflammatory processes while the innovation of experimentally-induced periodontal disease in both human and animal models allowed for more detailed research into the temporal progression of the pathogenesis of plaque-induced periodontal disease.

Historically, chronic plaque-induced periodontal diseases were divided into three categories: subclinical gingivitis, clinical gingivitis and periodontal breakdown.
