= Crown lengthening =

Dental procedure

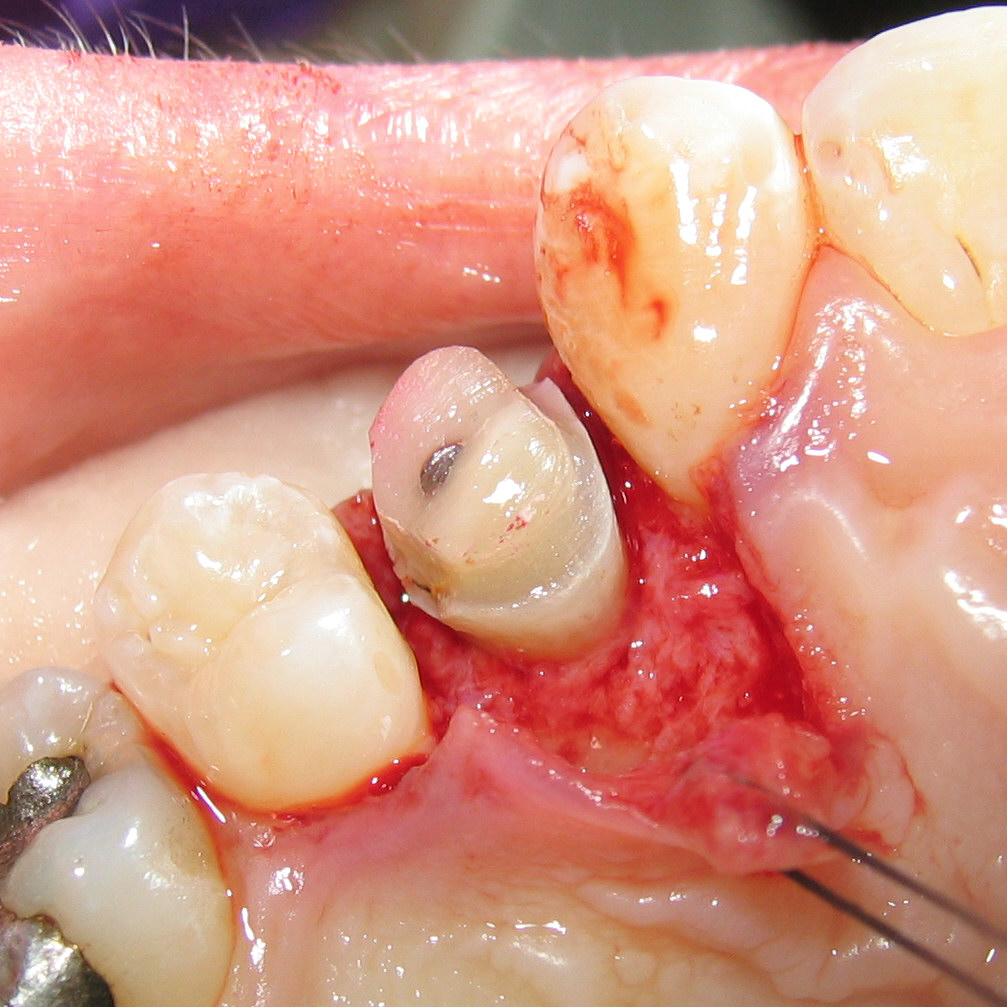
- A palatal view of a maxillary premolar during a crown lengthening procedure.
- MeSH: D016556

Crown lengthening is a surgical procedure performed by a dentist, or more frequently a periodontist, where more tooth is exposed by removing some of the gingival margin (gum) and supporting bone. Crown lengthening can also be achieved orthodontically (using braces) by extruding the tooth.

Crown lengthening is done for functional and/or aesthetic reasons. Functionally, crown lengthening is used to: 1) increase retention and resistance when placing a fabricated dental crown, 2) provide access to subgingival caries, 3) access accidental tooth perforations, and 4) access external root resorption. Aesthetically, crown lengthening is used to alter gum and tooth proportions, such as in a gummy smile. There are a number of procedures used to achieve an increase in crown length.

== Biomechanical considerations ==
=== Crown length ===
The remaining crown of the natural tooth needs to be sufficiently long to have adequate retention and resistance to withstand occlusal (biting) forces. Without adequate retention and resistance, a prosthetic crown can be dislodged and/or damaged. Suggested characteristics are: 1) 10-20° of occlusal convergence, 2) minimum height of 4 mm for molars and 3 mm for other teeth, 3) a height:width ratio of 0.4 or greater, and 4) proximal line angles should be conserved. When these characteristics are lacking, auxiliary retention (e.g. axial grooves) are needed.

=== Supracrestal tissue attachment ===
Supracrestal tissue attachment is the natural distance between the base of the gingival sulcus (G) and the height of the alveolar bone (I). The gingival sulcus (G) is a small crevice that lies between the enamel of the tooth crown and the sulcular epithelium. At the base of this crevice lies the junctional epithelium, which adheres via hemidesmosomes to the surface of the tooth, and from the base of the crevice to the height of the alveolar bone (C) is approximately 2 mm.

Previously known as biologic width, supracrestal tissue attachment (STA) consists of the junctional epithelium and connective tissue attachment above the alveolar crest. On average, STA is 2.04 mm, with the junctional epithelium and connective tissue constituting 0.97 and 1.07 mm, respectively. However, the STA has been observed to vary between 0.75 - 4.33 mm.

It is important to avoid invading the STA when fabricating dental restorations. If a dental restoration invades the STA, chronic inflammation is likely to occur which then causes pain, gum recession, and unpredictable loss of alveolar bone.

Due to the variation in STA and limits of precisely restoring a tooth to the coronal edge of the junctional epithelium, it is often recommended to remove enough bone to place restorative margins such that they maintain at least 3 mm of tooth and gum tissue above the alveolar crest.

=== Ferrule effect ===
In dentistry, the ferrule effect is, a "360° collar of the crown surrounding the parallel walls of the dentin extending coronal to the shoulder of the preparation". This circumferential collar should have a height of ~2 mm and width of ~1 mm. Presence of adequate ferrule helps resist tooth fracture by minimizing stress concentration at the junction of tooth structure and the dental restoration. This has been shown to significantly reduce the incidence of fracture in the endodontically treated tooth. Because beveled tooth structure is not parallel to the vertical axis of the tooth, it does not properly contribute to ferrule height; thus, a desire to bevel the crown margin by 1 mm would require an additional 1 mm of bone removal in the crown lengthening procedure. Frequently, however, restorations are performed without such a bevel.

Recent studies suggest that, while adequate ferrule is desirable, it should not come at the expense of removing too much remaining tooth and root structure. However, as little as 1 mm of additional tooth structure, when encased by a ferrule, provides great protection. If adequate ferrule cannot be achieved without significant tooth structure removal, tooth extraction should be considered.

=== Crown-to-root ratio ===
The alveolar bone surrounding a tooth also surrounds adjacent teeth. Removing bone for a crown lengthening procedure will effectively decrease the bony support available for surrounding teeth and unfavorably increase the crown-to-root ratio. Additionally, once alveolar bone is removed, it is almost impossible to restore it to previous levels. This has implications for a patient's future treatment options. For example, there might not be enough alveolar bone to support an implant in an area where a crown lengthening procedure has been completed. Thus, it would be prudent for patients to thoroughly discuss all of their treatment options with their dentist before undergoing an irreversible procedure such as crown lengthening.

== Crown lengthening techniques ==
=== Treatment planning ===
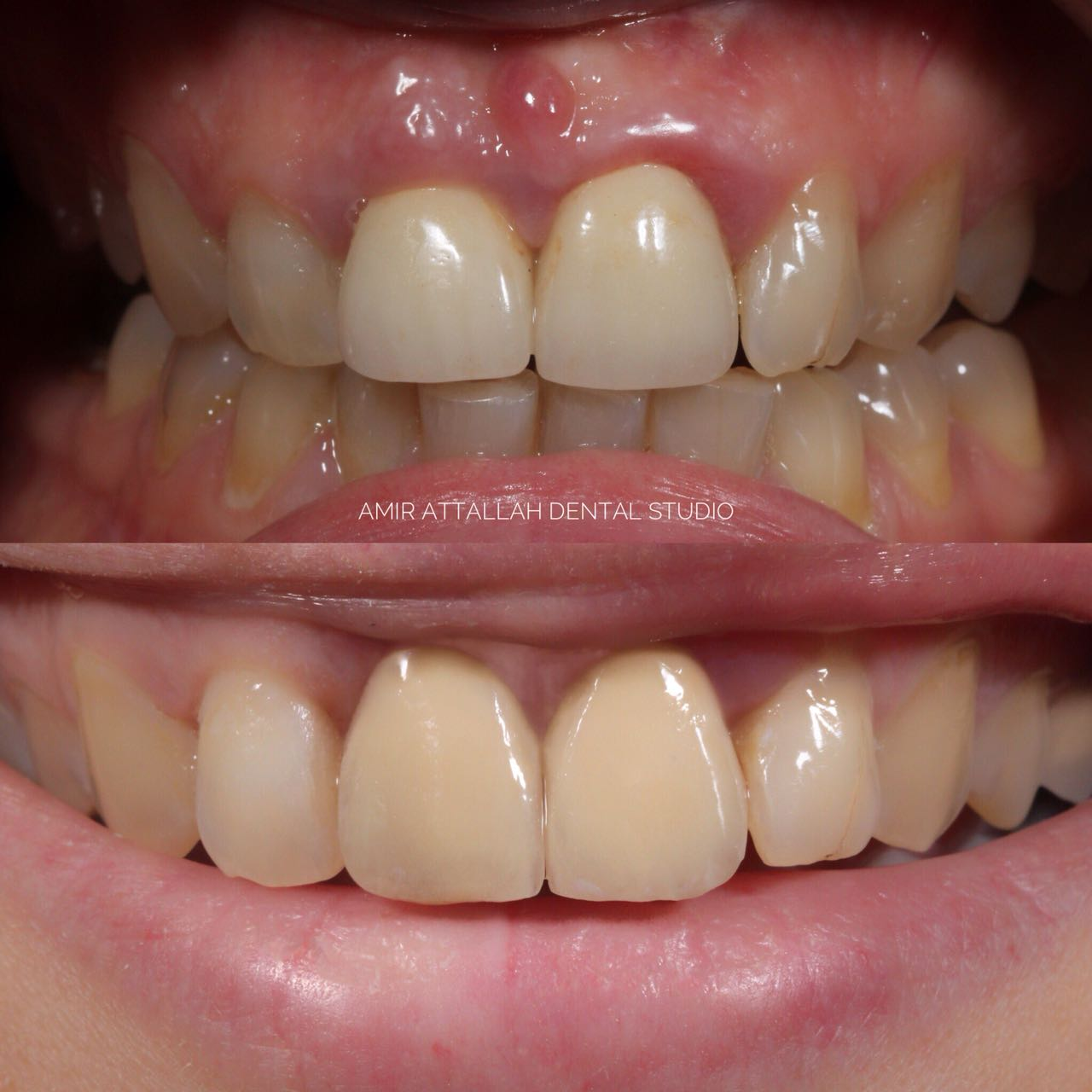
Replacement of unaesthetic crowns on the upper central teeth after undergoing crown lengthening and fabrication of new restorations.

Crown lengthening is often done in conjunction with other dental procedures (e.g. post and core, endodontic treatment) with the ultimate goal of saving the tooth. The prognosis for a tooth should be considered carefully. If multiple treatment procedures are necessary, each procedure costs time and money with the potential for failures or complications. Thus, tooth extraction may be a reasonable treatment option. The tooth could then be replaced with a dental implant.

Alternatively, orthodontic extrusion can be used to achieve crown lengthening. Using brackets, light forces can be used to pull the tooth away from the gums within a few months. A fiberotomy is performed after crown lengthening and is easily performed by the general dentist.

=== Apically repositioned flap with osseous recontouring (resection) ===
An apically repositioned flap is a widely used procedure that involves flap elevation with subsequent osseous contouring. The flap is designed such that it is replaced more apical to its original position and thus immediate exposure of sound tooth structure is gained. As discussed above, when planning a crown lengthening procedure consideration must be given to maintenance of the supracrestal tissue attachment.

As a general rule, at least 4 mm of sound tooth structure must be exposed at the time of surgery. This, allows for proliferation of the supracrestal soft tissues, which are estimated to cover 2–3 mm of the coronal root structure thereby leaving 1–2 mm of sound tooth structure supragingivally. Additionally, gingiva tends to regrow over abrupt changes in the bone contour. Therefore, the bone underlying the gingiva and adjacent teeth may need to be recontoured to prevent this.

Consequently, substantial amounts of attachment may have to be sacrificed when crown lengthening is accomplished with an apically positioned flap technique. Importantly, for esthetic reasons, symmetry of tooth length must be maintained between the right and left sides of the dental arch. This may, in some situations, call for the inclusion of even more teeth in the surgical procedure.

==== Indications ====
Crown lengthening of multiple teeth in a quadrant or sextant of the dentition

==== Contraindications ====
Single teeth in the aesthetic zone becomes increasingly destructive.

==== Technique ====
1. A reverse bevel incision is made using a scalpel. This initial incision is guided by pre-operative planning and is based on the amount of tooth structure to be exposed. The beveling incision also should follow a scalloped outline, to ensure maximal interproximal coverage of the alveolar bone when the flap subsequently is repositioned. Vertical releasing incisions extending out into the alveolar mucosa, past the mucogingival junction, are made at each of the end points of the reverse incision, thereby making apical repositioning of the flap possible.
2. A full‐thickness mucoperiosteal flap is then raised to expose the root surfaces. The flap, incorporating the buccal/ lingual gingiva and alveolar mucosa, then has to be elevated beyond the mucogingival line in order to be able later to reposition the soft tissue apically. The marginal collar of tissue is then removed with curettes.
3. Osseous (bone) recontouring is then performed using a rotating round bur and copious water spray or bone chisels. The recontouring should aim to re-create the normal form of the alveolar crest, but at a more apical level.
4. Following the osseous (bone) surgery, the flap is repositioned to the level of the newly recontoured alveolar bone crest and secured in position. Full soft tissue coverage is inherently more difficult and as such a periodontal dressing should be applied to protect the denuded interproximal alveolar bone to retain the soft tissue at the level of the bone crest.

==== Advantages ====
Immediate increase in sound tooth structure can be achieved.

==== Disadvantages ====
Difficult procedure for patients to tolerate, increased post-operative pain

=== Forced tooth eruption ===
Orthodontic tooth movement can be used to erupt teeth in adults. If moderate eruptive forces are applied, the entire eruptive apparatus will move in unison with the tooth. As such, the units required must be extruded a distance equal to or slightly longer than the portion of sound tooth structure that will be exposed in the following surgical treatment. Once stabilized, a full-thickness flap is then elevated and osseous recontouring is performed to expose the required tooth structure. To restore aesthetic proportions correctly, the hard and soft tissues of adjacent teeth should remain unchanged.

==== Indications ====
Forced tooth eruption is indicated where crown lengthening is required, but attachment and bone from adjacent teeth must be preserved.

==== Contraindications ====
Forced tooth eruption requires a fixed orthodontic appliance. This poses problems in patients with reduced dentitions; in such instances alternative crown lengthening procedures must be considered

==== Technique ====
Orthodontic brackets are bonded to the teeth requiring crown lengthening surgery and then to adjacent teeth, these are then combined within an archwire. A power elastic band is then tied from the bracket to the archwire (or the bar), which pulls the tooth coronally. The direction of the tooth movement must be carefully checked to ensure no tilting or movement of adjacent teeth occurs.

Forced tooth eruption can also be performed with fiberotomy. This technique is adopted when gingival margins and crystal bone height are to be maintained at their pretreatment locations. Fiberotomy is performed at 7-10 day intervals during treatment. A scalpel is used to sever supracrestal connective tissue fibres, thereby preventing crystal bone from following the root in a coronal direction.

==== Advantages ====
Preserves osseous structure around adjacent teeth

==== Disadvantages ====
Procedure requires fixed wire placement. Treatment time can be prolonged.

== Healing and timing of restoration ==
After surgical crown lengthening the gingival margin may gradually migrate coronally, so the position of the tissues is reassessed before the definitive restoration. Reduction of soreness and return to normal feeling often take one to two weeks. In a pilot study, beginning prosthetic treatment at six weeks produced clinical outcomes comparable to beginning at 14 weeks. The final timing is determined by the stability of the gingival margin.
