= Rete pegs =

Cellular structures which help bind epithelium to underlying connective tissue

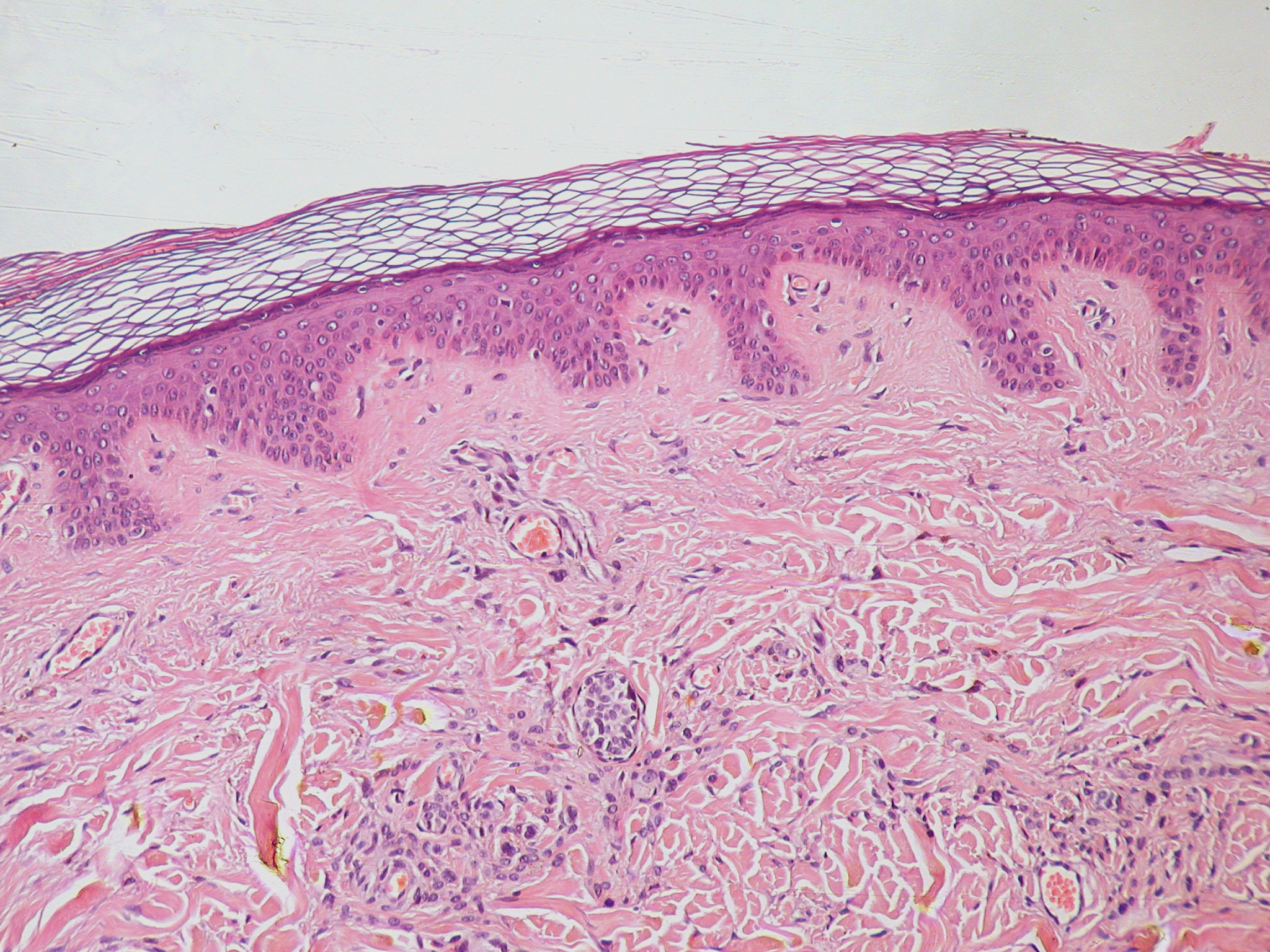
Skin epithelium (purple) with lamina propria (underlying connective tissue) (pink) -- the epithelium exhibits rete pegs. Rete pegs protect the tissue from shearing.

Rete pegs (also known as rete processes, rete ridges or epidermal ridges) are the epithelial extensions that project into the underlying connective tissue in both skin and mucous membranes.

In the epithelium of the mouth, the attached gingiva exhibit rete pegs, while the sulcular and junctional epithelia do not. Scar tissue lacks rete pegs and scars tend to shear off more easily than normal tissue as a result.

Also known as papillae, they are downward thickenings of the epidermis between the dermal papillae.

== Development and evolution ==
The formation of rete pegs (often referred to as rete ridges in developmental biology) is driven by an evolutionary and molecular mechanism entirely distinct from the development of other skin appendages like hair follicles and sweat glands. In mammals, the evolutionary acquisition of epidermal rete ridges closely coincides with the loss of fur density. It is proposed that mammals replaced the genetic program for forming discrete microscopic appendages with a distinct program that creates this interconnected appendage network.

During morphogenesis, the development of rete pegs requires significant signaling interactions between epidermal and dermal cells. Specifically, the broad epidermal activation of bone morphogenetic protein (BMP) signaling is required to organize the ridge networks around the underlying dermal pockets.

While mature scar tissue in adults typically lacks rete pegs (making it more prone to shearing), recent studies in neonatal mammals, such as pigs, demonstrate that these epidermal structures can regenerate de novo during early wound healing.
