= Periodontal surgery =

Form of dental surgery

Periodontal surgery is a form of dental surgery that prevents or corrects anatomical, traumatic, developmental, or plaque-induced defects in the bone, gingiva, or alveolar mucosa. The objectives of this surgery include accessibility of instruments to the root surface, elimination of inflammation, creation of an oral environment for plaque control, periodontal disease control, oral hygiene maintenance, maintaining proper embrasure space, addressing gingiva–alveolar mucosa problems, and esthetic improvement. Surgical procedures include crown lengthening, frenectomy, and mucogingival flap surgery.

== Indications ==
=== Contraindications ===
Some contraindications include:

- Patient with poor standard of plaque control
- Questionable long-term prognosis of patient dentition
- Pregnancy
- Smoking
- Severe cardiovascular disease
- Malignancy
- Bleeding disorders
- Uncontrolled diabetes
- Kidney disease
- Liver disease

=== Considerations ===
- The procedural selection in a periodontal surgery should rely on simplicity, predictability, efficiency, Mucogingival considerations, osseous topography, anatomic and physical limitations, age and systemic factors.
- The incisions should be clear, smooth, and well-defined to minimize the healing time. Such incisions prevent occurrence of uneven ragged flap edges.
- To maintain the functional zone of the attached keratinized gingiva, flaps should be designed for maximum use and retention of keratinized gingival tissue, as it prevents the need of secondary procedures.
- In the design of flaps, it needs to be ensured that there is adequate access and visibility. The design should also prevent bone exposure as it can lead to formation of dehiscence or fenestration.
- For prevention of excessive bleeding, hematoma formation, displacement, bone exposure, or infection, adequate flap stabilization should be ensured.
- The surgical procedure should be carried out such a manner that the postoperative healing takes place by primary intention and not by secondary intention.

== Surgical procedures ==
=== Crown lengthening ===
Crown lengthening is a technique for increasing crown height of teeth by flap surgery with or without bone surgery. There are two main types:

1. Aesthetic crown lengthening which is performed when a "gummy" smile is an issue for the patient
2. Functional crown lengthening is used to make an unrestorable tooth restorable. For example, a tooth with caries that extends below the gums may undergo crown lengthening so that the caries is no longer below the gums and a crown may be placed.

==== Contraindications ====
Untreated or unstable gum disease (periodontal disease) and gingival phenotype

==== Considerations ====
- Strategic value of tooth
- Crown/root ratio that will remain following surgery
- Aesthetics will be affected such as longer clinical crowns and loss of interdental papillae leading to "black triangles"
- It can result in exposure of furcations
- Mobility of teeth
- Post-op sensitivity due to root dentine exposure
- Patient may need long-term treatment until gingival margin stabilised (3–6 months).
- Patient must also be made aware prior to surgery that relapse is possible

==== Method ====
There are three main methods for surgical crown lengthening:

- Gingivectomy
- Apically repositioned flap (APF) surgery
- Apically repositioned flap (APF) with osseous reduction (osteoplasty/ostectomy)

=== Frenectomy ===
Frenectomy is indicated by thick, prominent muscle attachments known as fraena or a frenum with close attachment to the gum margin. Thick frenum attachment or close attachment to gum margin can contribute to increased plaque accumulation, persistent inflammation, muscular pull on gum and affect gum contour.

Usual sites for frenectomy are buccal regions of upper and lower incisors, upper canines and premolars. Frenectomy is rarely required for lingual sites.

==== Procedure ====
Frenectomy consists of:

- Cutting the attachment of the frenum to the gums
- Administering local anaesthetic
- Stretching the lip and gripping the frenum with forceps
- Cutting through base of frenum on both sides of forceps
- Incision on alveolar side near to bone leaving the periosteum intact.
- Removal of the frenal tissue and suturing the edges of the wound closely with resorbable sutures
- Placing swabs over the wound
- The patient is instructed to rinse twice daily with chlorhexidine mouthwash.

=== Mucogingival flap surgery ===
Mucogingival surgery is a procedure where the gums are separated from teeth and temporarily folded back to allow the dentist to directly view and reach root surface of the tooth and bone. It is used for crown lengthening surgery. It also, if required, can be used for guided tissue regeneration or open flap debridement (OFD) to treat gum disease (periodontitis/periodontal disease). The presence of bacteria, in the form of dental plaque/tartar/calculus on the root of a tooth, can cause inflammation of the gums resulting in gum disease. This can lead to bone loss around the affected teeth and if left untreated, lead to tooth loss. When a tooth has very deep periodontal pockets it may not be possible to fully remove the dental plaque/tartar/calculus from the tooth's root surface with scaling alone. In open flap debridement (OFD) the gum is peeled back to make it possible for the dentist to see and ensure full removal of tartar/calculus from these difficult to access areas. Teeth with furcation defects as a result of gum recession may require open flap debridement (OFD) as these areas can be very difficult to clean.

==== Mucogingival flaps thickness ====
Full thickness flap involves incision down to bone. Using blunt dissection, the flap is raised from bone. Full thickness flap is a simple procedure which provides access to root surface and bone. The procedure leaves minimal post-operative discomfort. It provides limited mobility of flap and is unsuitable for grafting.

Split thickness flap involves sharp cutting of tissues and leaving the underlying periosteum intact. The procedure prevents exposure dehiscence and allows good blood supply for grafting. It does not provide access to underlying bone or root surface and results in greater post-operative discomfort.
