= Frank Beube =

American periodontist (1904–1995)

- Born: 1904; Kingston, Ontario, Canada
- Died: March 12, 1995 (aged 90–91); New York City, New York, U.S.
- Education: University of Toronto
- Known for: Research on bone grafting and regeneration; Author of Periodontics (1953); Development of periodontal curriculum
- Scientific career
- Fields: Periodontology, Dentistry

Frank E. Beube (July 1, 1904 – June 14, 1995) was a Canadian-born American periodontist and a pioneer in the field of periodontics.

== Education ==
Beube was born in Kingston, Ontario, Canada. He graduated from the University of Toronto Faculty of Dentistry in 1930 before emigrating to the United States.

== Career ==
Beube served as director of the Department of Periodontology after having volunteers on faculty in the 1930s.

== Legacy ==
Beube died in New York on June 14, 1995, at the age of 90.

In honor of his service to the Department of Periodontology, the postgraduate periodontics conference room on VC-7 of the Columbia University College of Dental Medicine is called the Frank Beube Conference Room.
