= Edgar Coolidge =

Edgar Coolidge may refer to:

- Edgar S. Coolidge (1855–?), member of the Vermont House of Representatives
- Edgar D. Coolidge (1881–1967), American dentist and endodontist.
