= Gingival fibers =

Connective tissue between the teeth and gums

In dental anatomy, the gingival fibers are the connective tissue fibers that inhabit the gingival tissue (gums) adjacent to teeth and help hold the tissue firmly against the teeth. They are primarily composed of type I collagen, although type III fibers are also involved.

These fibers, unlike the fibers of the periodontal ligament, in general, attach the tooth to the gingival tissue, rather than the tooth to the alveolar bone.

== Functions of the gingival fibers ==
The gingival fibers accomplish the following tasks:

- They hold the marginal gingiva against the tooth
- They provide the marginal gingiva with enough rigidity to withstand the forces of mastication without distorting
- They serve to stabilize the marginal gingiva by uniting it with both the tissue of the more rigid attached gingiva as well as the cementum layer of the tooth.

== Gingival fibers and periodontitis ==
In theory, gingival fibers are the protectors against periodontitis, as once they are breached, they cannot be regenerated. When destroyed, the gingival sulcus (labelled G in the diagram) increases in depth apically, allowing more debris and bacteria to remain in intimate contact with the delicate sulcular and junctional epithelia for longer times.

== Types of gingival fibers ==
The gingival fibers, (H), extend from the cementum (B) into the attached gingiva. Some fibers extend coronally into the crest of the free gingiva, some horizontally, and still other extend horizontally over the crest of the alveolar bone, (C), and then apically to connect on the facial aspect of the buccal plate of the alveolar bone.

There are three groups within which gingival fibers are arranged:

- dentogingival group - there are three types of fibers within this group:
  - fibers that extend towards the crest of the gingiva
  - fibers that extend laterally to the outer surface of the gingiva and
  - fibers that extend outward, past the height of the alveolar crest, and then downward along the cortex of the alveolar bone.
- circular group - these fibers are unique in that they exist entirely within the gingiva and do not contact the tooth
- transseptal group - these fibers have traditionally been described as spanning the interproximal tissue between adjacent teeth, into which they are embedded. However, two other types of fibers have been described in this group:
  - semicircular fibers - fibers that run through the facial and lingual gingiva around each tooth, attaching to the interproximal surfaces of the same tooth.
  - transgingival fibers - fibers that run between two non-adjacent teeth and are embedded in the cementum of their proximal surfaces, passing around the tooth in the middle of the two teeth attached with these fibers.
