= Edgar D. Coolidge =

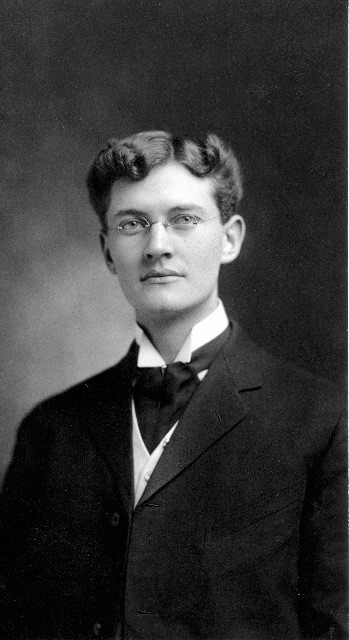
Edgar D. Coolidge as a young man

Dr. Edgar D. Coolidge (July 15, 1881 - Aug. 12, 1967) was an American dentist and endodontist.

== Early life ==
Born on a farm in Galesburg, Illinois, he attended Knox College from 1901 to 1903 and received a DDS (Doctor of Dental Surgery) degree from the Chicago College of Dental Surgery, which later became the Loyola University Chicago Dental School. He earned a Master of Science degree from Northwestern University in 1930.

== Career ==
Coolidge was Professor and Head of Materia Medica and Therapeutics at the University of Illinois at Chicago College of Dentistry from 1913 to 1923, and was on the faculty of the Loyola Dental School from 1927 to 1959. He also had a private dental practice in endodontics and periodontics. Coolidge was one of the initiators in organizing the American Association of Endodontists, and was a charter member and served on the AAE's first Constitution and By-Laws Committee. The AAE's highest honor is called the Edgar D. Coolidge Award and is given to an individual who has displayed exemplary dedication to dentistry and to endodontics. He served as President of the Chicago Dental Society, Illinois State Dental Society, Odontographic Society of Chicago, American Academy of Periodontology, and Xi Psi Phi fraternity, and was an author of many publications and contributor to many textbooks.
