= Junctional epithelium =

Area of gum tissue which attaches to the base of a tooth

In dental anatomy, the junctional epithelium (JE) is that epithelium which lies at, and in health also defines, the base of the gingival sulcus (i.e. where the gums attach to a tooth). The probing depth of the gingival sulcus is measured by a calibrated periodontal probe. In a healthy case, the probe is gently inserted, slides by the sulcular epithelium (SE), and is stopped by the epithelial attachment (EA). However, the probing depth of the gingival sulcus may be considerably different from the true histological gingival sulcus depth.

== Location ==
The junctional epithelium, a nonkeratinized stratified squamous epithelium, lies immediately apical to the sulcular epithelium, which lines the gingival sulcus from the base to the free gingival margin, where it interfaces with the epithelium of the oral cavity. The gingival sulcus is bounded by the enamel of the crown of the tooth and the sulcular epithelium. Immediately apical to the base of the pocket, and coronal to the most coronal of the gingival fibers is the junctional epithelium. The JE attaches to the surface of the tooth by way of the EA with hemidesmosomes and is, on average, roughly 1 mm in width in the apico-coronal dimension, constituting about one half of the biologic width. The attachment of the JE to the tooth surface can occur on enamel, cementum, or dentin. The position of the EA on the tooth surface is initially on the cervical half of the anatomical crown when the tooth first becomes functional after tooth eruption.

== Origin ==
Junctional epithelium is derived from the reduced enamel epithelium (REE) during tooth development. Before the eruption of the tooth and after enamel maturation, the ameloblasts secrete a basal lamina on the tooth surface that serves as a part of the primary EA. As the tooth actively erupts, the coronal part of the fused and surrounding epithelium peels back off the crown. The ameloblasts also develop hemidesmosomes for the primary EA and become firmly attached to the enamel surface. However, the cervical part of the fused tissue remains attached to the neck of the tooth by the primary EA. This fused tissue, which remains near the cementoenamel junction (CEJ) after the tooth erupts, serves as the initial JE of the tooth, creating the first tissue attached to the tooth surface. This tissue is later replaced by a definitive JE as the root is formed.

== Structure ==
Cells in the junctional epithelium tend to have wide intercellular spaces and fewer desmosomal junctions, to allow the transmission of white blood cells (WBCs) from lamina propria's blood vessels to the bottom of the gingival sulcus, to help prevent disease. In addition, the JE is also thinner than the sulcular epithelium, ranging coronally from only 15 to 30 cells thick at the floor of the gingival sulcus, and then tapering to a final thickness of 3 to 4 cells at its apical part. The superficial, or suprabasal, cells of the JE serve as part of the EA of the gingiva to the tooth surface. These superficial, or suprabasal, epithelial cells of the JE provide the hemidesmosomes and an internal basal lamina that create the EA, because this is a cell-to-noncellular type of intercellular junction. The structure of the EA is similar to that of the junction between the epithelium and subadjacent connective tissue; the internal basal lamina consists of a lamina lucida and lamina densa.

This internal basal lamina of the EA is continuous with the external basal lamina between the junctional epithelium and the lamina propria at the apical extent of the JE. The EA is very strong in a healthy state, acting as a type of seal between the soft gingival tissue and the hard tooth surface. The deepest layer of the JE, or basal layer, undergoes constant and rapid cell division, or mitosis. This process allows a constant coronal migration as the cells die and are shed into the gingival sulcus. The few layers present in the JE — from its basal layer to the suprabasal, or superficial, layer — does not show any change in cellular appearance related to maturation, unlike other types of gingival tissue. Thus, the JE does not mature like keratinized tissue, such as the marginal gingiva or attached gingiva, which fills its matured superficial cells with keratin.

Nor does JE mature on a lesser level like nonkeratinized tissue of the sulcular gingiva and throughout the rest of the oral cavity, which enlarges its cells as they mature and migrate superficially. The JE cells do not mature and form into a granular layer or intermediate layer. Without a keratinizing superficial layer at the free surface of the JE, there is no physical barrier to microbial attack. Other structural and functional characteristics of the JE must compensate for the absence of this barrier. The JE fulfills this difficult task with its special structural framework and the collaboration of its epithelial and nonepithelial cells that provide very potent antimicrobial mechanisms, such as the white blood cells. However, these defense mechanisms do not preclude the development of extensive inflammatory lesions in the gingival tissue, and, occasionally, the inflammatory lesion may eventually progress to the loss of bone and the connective tissue attachment to the tooth.

The JE cells have many organelles in their cytoplasm, such as rough endoplasmic reticulum, Golgi complex, and mitochondria, indicating a high metabolic activity. However, the JE cells remain immature or undifferentiated until they die and are shed or lost in the gingival sulcus. Lysosomes are also found in large numbers in JE epithelial cells; enzymes contained within these lysosomes participate in the destruction of bacteria contained in dental biofilm.

== Pathology ==
The increased permeability of the JE that allows emigration of the PMN type of WBC also allows microorganisms from the dental biofilm (especially noted is P. gingivalis, and associated toxins from the exposed tooth surface) to enter this tissue from the deeper lamina propria, setting up the possibility of infection to occur. Damage to the junctional epithelium results in it being irregular in texture, rather than smooth, at its surface. Most importantly is the formation of pocket epithelium within the periodontal pocket, which is a histopathological characteristic of periodontal disease, having the true apical migration of the EA. In addition, there is the presence of ulceration with gingival hyperplasia, including the formation of rete ridges and connective tissue papillae at the one smooth interface of the JE with the lamina propria. Further, there is increased levels of exfoliation of epithelial cells, WBC migration, and bacterial internalization, as well as internalization-induced programmed epithelial cell death.

== See also ==
- Oral mucosa
- Periodontal disease
