= Gingival margin =

Region of exposed gums bordering each tooth

- The gingival margin (F) is the most coronal point of the gingiva, depicted as the zenith of the pink hill in this diagram. To the left lies the sulcular epithelium within the gingival sulcus (G), and to the right lies the oral epithelium (E).

Details

Identifiers
- Latin: margo gingivalis
- TA98: A05.1.01.109
- TA2: 2791
- FMA: 75112

In dental anatomy, the free gingival margin is the interface between the sulcular epithelium and the epithelium of the oral cavity. This interface exists at the most coronal point of the gingiva, otherwise known as the crest of the marginal gingiva.

Because the short part of gingiva existing above the height of the underlying alveolar process of maxilla, known as the free gingiva, is not bound down to the periosteum that envelops the bone, it is moveable. However, due to the presence of gingival fibers such as the dentogingival and circular fibers, the free gingiva remains pulled up against the surface of the tooth unless being pushed away by, for example, a periodontal probe or the bristles of a toothbrush.

== Gingival retraction or recession ==
Gingival retraction or gingival recession is when there is lateral movement of the gingival margin away from the tooth surface. It is usually termed gingival retraction as an intentional procedure, and in such cases it is performed by mechanical, chemical, or electrical means in order to perform certain dental surgery procedures. It is usually referred to as gingival recession as a spontaneous or non-intentional presentation, and in such cases it may indicate an underlying inflammation, a pocket formation or displacement of the marginal gingivae away from the tooth by mechanical, chemical, or surgical means. It may expose the roots of the teeth, similarly to gingival recession.

=== Gingival retraction ===
==== Gingival retraction paste ====
Use of gingival retraction paste has been demonstrated to be most successful in providing a dry field and imposing minimal injury on the surrounding periodontium. It has a decreased ability to retract gingival tissues however, in comparison to a retraction cord.

==== Gingival retraction cord ====
A retraction cord, although more damaging to the gingival tissues, has proven to displace gingival tissues more effectively and is therefore recommended in instances where thick periodontium is present. Without any chemical additions, such as epinephrine or sulphate compounds, the cord on its own does not produce haemostasis at the sulcus.

== See also ==
- Running room
