= Sulcular epithelium =

Area of gum tissue

The gingival sulcus (G) is bounded by the enamel (A) of the crown of the tooth and the sulcular epithelium. The sulcular epithelium is that epithelium which exists on the sulcular side of the free gingival margin (F). The oral epithelium (E) exists on the other side of the free gingival margin.

The sulcular epithelium is a thin, non-keratinized epithelial lining that forms the smooth inner wall of the gingival sulcus, extending from the gingival margin coronally to the dentogingival junction apically. The gingival sulcus normally measures 0.5–3 mm in healthy individuals; an increase beyond this range may indicate pseudopocket formation or periodontal disease. The sulcular epithelium primarily acts as the protective barrier against foreign substances while also playing a crucial immunological role due to its semi-permeable nature. Structural and functional changes in the sulcular epithelium are observed during the onset and progression of periodontal disease.

In dental anatomy, the sulcular epithelium is that epithelium which lines the gingival sulcus. It is apically bounded by the junctional epithelium and meets the epithelium of the oral cavity at the height of the free gingival margin. The sulcular epithelium is nonkeratinized.

== Anatomy/location ==
Anatomically, the sulcus is bounded by the tooth surface on one side and the sulcular epithelium on the other, in a bucco-lingual dimension. It typically contains gingival crevicular fluid which is a serum-like tissue transudate that diffuses through the sulcular epithelium from the post-capillary venules of the dentogingival plexus, providing a nutrient source for microbes along with desquamated epithelial cells, inflammatory cells, and bacteria. Positioned immediately coronal to the junctional epithelium, the sulcular epithelium forms part of the dentogingival junction, a region where the mucosa meets the tooth surface and functions as an essential yet vulnerable seal against microbial entry. It is continuous coronally with the oral epithelium at the gingival crest and cervically with the junctional epithelium, lacks keratinization under normal conditions, and varies from 2–3 cell layers coronally to 10–15 layers apically.

Initially located on the cervical enamel in youth, the sulcus gradually migrates toward the cementoenamel junction and onto cementum with age and periodontal changes. Although not directly exposed to the external oral cavity and therefore somewhat shielded from mechanical abrasion, its position within the sulcus makes it more permeable and particularly susceptible to microbial challenge. While it remains non-keratinized under normal conditions, the sulcular epithelium has been shown to keratinize if repositioned away from the tooth or if the tooth is lost, demonstrating its inherent keratinization potential.

== Origin/development ==
The sulcular epithelium originates developmentally during tooth eruption when the reduced enamel epithelium derived from the enamel organ fuses with the oral epithelium to form a continuous epithelial lining around the tooth.

The junctional epithelium is attached coronally to the sulcular epithelium which is thicker. At the bottom of the sulcus is the junctional epithelium in which the development starts with the reduced enamel epithelium the protective layer of epithelial tissue that covers the enamel before the eruption of the tooth forming a seal.The rest of the part separating the junctional epithelium with the oral epithelium at the free gingival margin is covered by the sulcular epithelium. Gingival epithelium complex covers the alveolar bone to the neck of the tooth and the sulcular epithelium is a component or part of this complex which helps in the preservation of periodontal health.

The sulcular epithelium is described as stratified but non-keratinized unlike the attached gingival epithelium which is keratinized.The sulcular epithelium expresses a characteristic cytokeratin pattern in particular keratins K4 and K13.

== Histology ==
The sulcular epithelium is a stratified squamous, non-keratinized epithelium that lines the gingival sulcus and extends from the coronal edge of the junctional epithelium to the free gingival margin.

=== Microscopic structure ===
Histologically, the sulcular epithelium is composed of three cellular layers typical of non-keratinized oral epithelia:

- Basal layer (stratum basale): a single layer of cuboidal to columnar cells attached to a continuous basement membrane via hemidesmosomes.
- Prickle-cell layer (stratum spinosum): several layers of polygonal cells linked by numerous desmosomal junctions.
- Superficial layer: flattened cells without surface keratinisation, differentiating it from the oral epithelium facing the oral cavity.

Unlike the oral gingival epithelium, the sulcular epithelium lacks a stratum granulosum and stratum corneum, consistent with its non-keratinized nature.

=== Interface with connective tissue ===
The epithelial–connective tissue interface is relatively smooth, with fewer and shallower rete ridges than seen in masticatory mucosa.

This smooth interface reduces mechanical stress and is consistent with its protected location within the sulcus.

The underlying lamina propria contains a dense collagen network and a rich vascular supply that supports the rapid turnover of epithelial cells.

=== Turnover and cell renewal ===
Cell division occurs predominantly in the basal layer, with cells migrating coronally and superficially. The turnover rate is slower than the junctional epithelium but faster than fully keratinized gingival epithelium.

=== Relationship to junctional epithelium ===
The sulcular epithelium joins apically with the junctional epithelium, forming part of the dentogingival junction.

Compared to the junctional epithelium, the sulcular epithelium:

- Has more cell layers
- Is less permeable
- Exhibits more developed intercellular junctions
- Provides a more substantial physical barrier to microbial invasion

This structural difference explains why the junctional epithelium is more actively involved in host–microbe interaction, whereas the sulcular epithelium plays a more protective role.

=== Immunological role ===
The sulcular epithelium contains resident Langerhans cells, dendritic cells, and immune mediators involved in monitoring the microbial environment of the sulcus. Although less specialized than the junctional epithelium in immune signalling, it still participates in the early defence against periodontal pathogens.

== Clinical significance ==
=== Permeability and barrier function ===
Sulcular epithelium functions primarily as a protective barrier that lines the soft tissue of the gingival sulcus. This key characteristic is achieved due to the presence of tight junctions (TJs) and adherens junctions (AJs). (Figure 2)

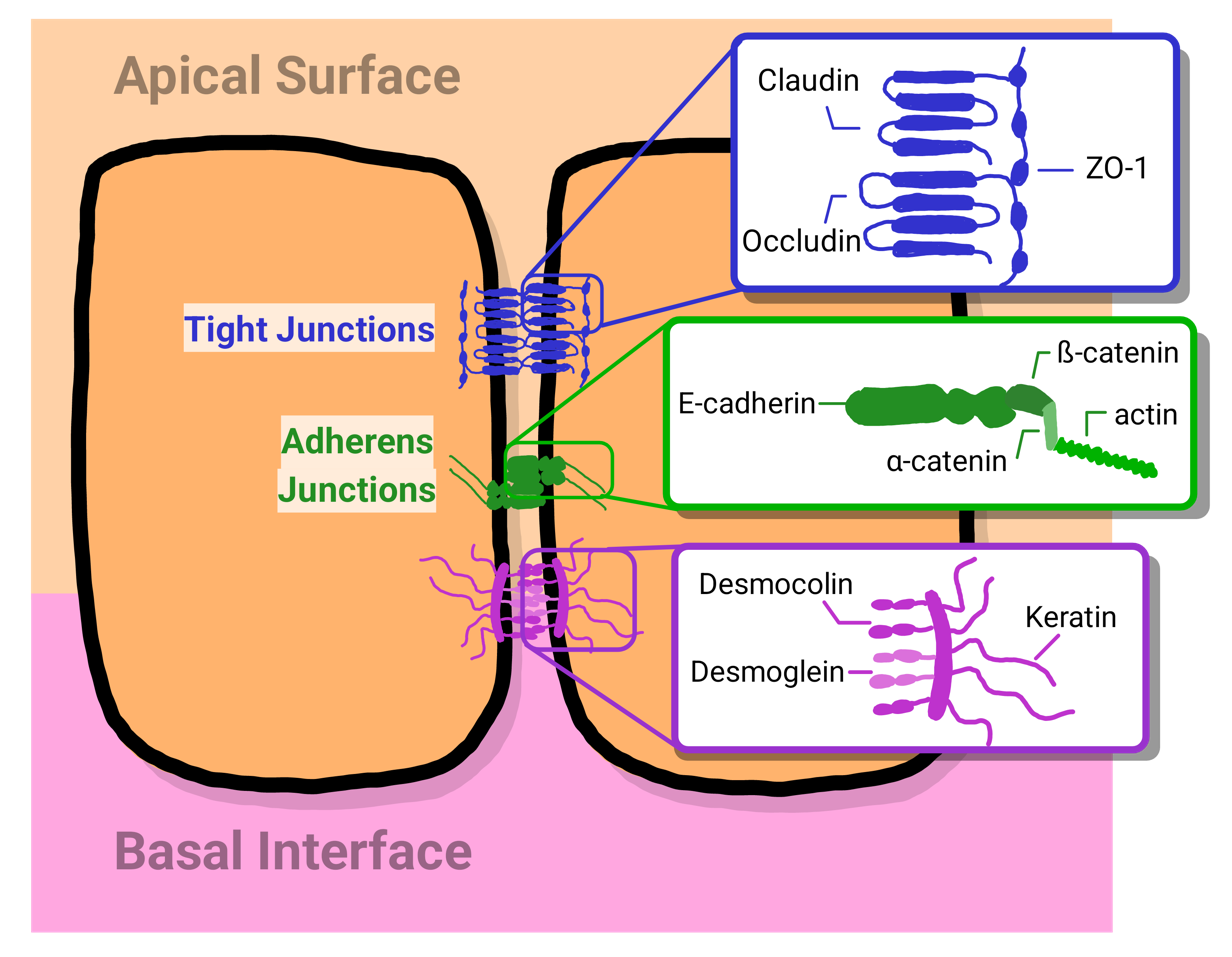
Figure 2: Schematic illustration of epithelial cell junctions, including tight junctions and adherens junctions

Besides being a physical barrier, the sulcular epithelium is able to release antimicrobial peptides which retard the growth of bacteria.This is through the secretion of defensins (β-defensins (hBD-1 and hBD-2)) which are a unique feature of the sulcular epithelium as compared to the junctional epithelium.

However if plaque build-up occurs due to the lack of proper oral hygiene practices, bacteria are able to adhere to the sulcular epithelium using their fimbriae. It is discovered that the biofilm adhered to the sulcular epithelium consists of a rich content of glycocalyces, suggesting that these virulence factors allow the survival and colonisation of the periodontal pathogens. The fimbriae then induces the inflammatory response via the release of proinflammatory cytokines, leading to bone resorption.

During periodontal disease, the epithelial barrier of the sulcular epithelium becomes discontinuous or ulcerated, compromising the integrity of these junctional complexes. This results in an increase in epithelial permeability and facilitates the passage of bacterial products. This is further promoted through the non-keratinised nature of the epithelium which also acts as a semi-permeable membrane. The transport of harmful bacterial products into the gingiva allows the detection of bacteria action which allows the sulcular epithelium to retaliate through the diffusion of the gingival crevicular fluid (GCF) containing inflammatory cells (neutrophils & small lymphocytes) & inflammatory mediators (IL-8, CXCL8 chemokines) into the sulcus. Nonetheless, the extent of infiltration by polymorphonuclear cells through the sulcular epithelium is less compared to the more permeable junctional epithelium.

=== Gingival crevicular fluid as a biomarker source ===
For research purposes, utilisation of GCF (gingival crevicular fluid) or PISF (peri-implant sulcular fluid) have been proven to be reliable indicators to examine gingival health, though this is rarely done in clinical practice. Through saliva samples obtained from individuals, the GCF/PISF mixed within saliva have been studied for the level of cytokines and inflammatory mediators. Examples of these mediators include Interleukin (IL) 1-ß, IL-6, macrophage chemotactic protein, interferon g-induced protein 10 (IP-10) and vascular endothelial growth factor (VEGF). Results indicate that individuals with periodontal disease have a significant increase in cytokine count compared to individuals who are of good gingival health. This is explained to be due to the increased interaction between the bacterial biofilm and the cells of the periodontal tissue, leading to heightened diffusion of these mediators along with the GCF into the gingival sulcus.

=== Changes that occur during the onset of gingivitis and periodontitis and its role in bleeding on probing ===
Following the infiltration of bacteria and its products within the sulcular epithelium, the inflammatory response triggers the release of matrix metalloproteinases which cause collagen destruction.

Studies suggest that this mechanism is through the activation of Toll-Like Receptors (TLRs, such as TLR-9) which are present on epithelial cells upon binding with bacterial products (such as lipopolysaccharides, unmyelinated CpG motifs). The expression of these collagenolytic matrix metalloproteinases like MMP-13 and activated NF-κB subunit p65 (a type of transcription factor) was more commonly present in periodontitis tissue compared to gingivitis tissue, indicating that the extent of connective tissue destruction accelerates with the progression of the disease.

As an effort to curb the incoming bacterial invasion, the basal cells of the sulcular epithelium, being triggered by the ongoing inflammation, proliferate in hopes to maintain an intact barrier against the bacteria and their products.

Due to the ongoing inflammation, engorgement of vessels and vasodilation occurs at the underlying connective tissue of the sulcular epithelium. The concurrent destruction of the collagen will then result in the thinning or ulceration of the sulcular epithelium, making the engorged and more abundant blood capillaries more susceptible to rupture upon innocuous mechanical stimuli (such as those during toothbrushing, probing, flossing, eating).

In the case of bleeding on probing, which is a diagnostic tool for dentists to routinely check the condition of the gums, the periodontal probe, when inserted gently into the gingival sulcus, is used to measure the depth of the periodontal pocket but upon contact with the sulcular epithelium, should not cause bleeding in individuals with good gingival health. This is due to the resiliency of the sulcular epithelium that has a healthy thickness with a strong underlying collagen architecture. Sites with greater inflammation tend to have more cells yet possess a weaker collagen architecture, making bleeding on probing more noticeable, which is a common finding in stage 2 (early) gingivitis. This highlights the importance of the sulcular epithelium as a physical barrier to protect the underlying connective tissue. When its surface is ulcerated and discontinuous, it allows bacteria to enter more easily. In fact, the total area where bacteria can come in contact with the affected gum tissue is estimated to be as large as the palm of an adult’s hand.

Once in the established lesion stage of gingivitis, collagen depletion continues as more polymorphonuclear (PMN) cells seep into the gingival sulcus and infiltrate the spaces within the sulcular epithelium. Permeability of the gingival sulcus (sulcular epithelium & junctional epithelium) also increases with the progress of gingival inflammation. Once the relative volume occupied by PMN cells at the junctional epithelium reaches 60%, the junctional epithelium is unable to adhere to the root surface of the tooth and separates from it while the apical portion of the junctional epithelium migrates apically. This process, known as apical migration, results in the increase of the sulcular epithelium lining of this ‘false pocket’ (pseudopocket).

=== Keratinization of sulcular epithelium ===
Although the inherent nature of the sulcular epithelium is non-keratinised, studies have discovered the potentiality of sulcular epithelium to keratinise under certain environmental conditions. It was shown that when exposed to the environment of the gingival surface, the sulcular epithelium develops into a keratinised squamous epithelium similar to that on the regular outer surface of the gingiva.

Besides that, maintaining a prolonged strict oral hygiene through proper intrasulcular toothbrushing technique could promote the keratinisation of the sulcular epithelium through the elimination of the bacterial flora within the sulcus. However, the clinical significance of the keratinisation of sulcular epithelium remains questionable as its contribution to the strength of the semi-permeable barrier is minimal and inducing keratinisation is also suggested to interfere with the healing process in periodontitis or after surgery. Others also warn against keratinisation of the adjacent junctional epithelium which could compromise its attachment to the tooth, defeating its purpose as a physical barrier.

=== Clinical relevance of sulcular epithelium in periodontal surgery ===
It was historically practised that the sulcular epithelium was removed during periodontal surgery. It was thought that the diseased ‘pocket epithelium’ could prevent re-attachment of healthy connective tissue and new periodontal ligament to the root surface.Furthermore, the ‘pocket epithelium’ which includes the sulcular epithelium was considered as a pathologic tissue lining containing bacteria and inflammatory cells which could result in periodontal destruction.

Nonetheless, a study has demonstrated that its removal during flap surgery did not worsen attachment gain, pocket reduction or the healing outcome. In fact, its removal could lead to gingiva recession, a poorer esthetic outcome and increased root sensitivity or caries risk. Hence, it was concluded that the sulcular epithelium plays a protective role and shouldn’t be routinely removed unlike older periodontal techniques which necessitate it.

=== Role in the onset of Gingival Cyst ===
Some studies suggest that the gingival cyst may have developed from the odontogenic epithelium or from the surface or sulcular epithelium that has been traumatically implanted in the area.
