= Chronic periodontitis =

Chronic inflammation of the gums

Chronic periodontitis is one of the seven categories of periodontitis as defined by the American Academy of Periodontology 1999 classification system. Chronic periodontitis is a common disease of the oral cavity consisting of chronic inflammation of the periodontal tissues that is caused by the accumulation of profuse amounts of dental plaque. Periodontitis initially begins as gingivitis and can progress onto chronic and subsequent aggressive periodontitis according to the 1999 classification.

Diagnosing chronic periodontitis is important in its early stages to prevent severe and irreversible damage to the protective and supportive structures of the tooth. However, due to chronic periodontitis being a painless progressing disease, few patients will seek dental care in the early stages. Mild to moderate chronic periodontitis can be managed by proper mechanical removal of the biofilm and calculus subgingivally. Full and effective oral hygiene and regular 3 monthly periodontal checkups are important for maintaining the stability of the disease.

Chronic periodontitis is prevalent in adults and seniors worldwide. In the US around 35% of adults (30–90 years) are affected. The cumulative effects of alveolar bone loss, attachment loss and pocket formation is more apparent with an increase in age. Age is related to the incidence of periodontal destruction: "...in a well-maintained population who practises oral home care and has regular check-ups, the incidence of incipient periodontal destruction increases with age, the highest rate occurs between 50 and 60 years, and gingival recession is the predominant lesion before 40 years, while periodontal pocketing is the principal mode of destruction between 50 and 60 years of age."

There are a variety of periodontal risk factors which can affect the prevalence, rate, extent and severity of the disease progression. Major risk factors include smoking, lack of oral hygiene with inadequate plaque biofilm control.

There is a slow to moderate rate of disease progression but the patient may have periods of rapid progression ("bursts of destruction"). Chronic periodontitis can be associated with local predisposing factors (e.g. tooth-related or iatrogenic factors). The disease may be modified by and be associated with systemic diseases (e.g. diabetes mellitus, HIV infection) It can also be modified by factors other than systemic disease such as smoking and emotional stress, anxiety and depression. Care should be taken however, when diagnosing a patient who smokes as smoking can alter some of the results of an examination. In smokers, the gingiva are pale and fibrous and tend to bleed less while being probed due to the effect of nicotine on the vasculature by vasoconstricting them. Thus, a lowered response is produced and this explains why incorrect data can be gained. There is also an increase in supragingival calculus alongside visible nicotine staining. The anterior dentition occasionally have recession and maxillary anterior and palatal surfaces are more adversely affected.

== Pathophysiology ==
Chronic periodontitis is initiated by Gram-negative tooth-associated microbial biofilms that elicit a host response, which results in bone and soft tissue destruction. In response to endotoxin derived from periodontal pathogens, several osteoclast-related mediators target the destruction of alveolar bone and supporting connective tissue such as the periodontal ligament. Major drivers of this aggressive tissue destruction are matrix metalloproteinases (MMPs), cathepsins, and other osteoclast-derived enzymes.

=== Plaque hypothesis ===
At least two mechanisms of the microbiology of periodontitis have been described: the specific plaque hypothesis and the non-specific plaque hypothesis. Consensus is that neither view is entirely correct, but via a middle path, that damage is due to a shift in the relative populations of more and less dangerous bacteria in the plaque. This is called the ecological plaque hypothesis. The disease is associated with a variable microbial pattern.

Anaerobic species of bacteria Porphyromonas gingivalis, Bacteroides forsythus, Treponema denticola, Prevotella intermedia, Fusobacterium nucleatum, Eubacterium sp. have all been implicated in chronic periodontitis.

Microaerophile bacteria Actinomyces actinomycetemcomitans, Campylobacter rectus, and Eikenella corrodens also may play a role in chronic periodontitis.

== Signs and symptoms ==
In the early stages, chronic periodontitis has few symptoms and in many individuals the disease has progressed significantly before they seek treatment. Symptoms may include the following:

- Redness or bleeding of gums while brushing teeth, using dental floss or biting into hard food (e.g. apples) (though this may occur even in gingivitis, where there is no attachment loss)
- Gum swelling that reoccurs
- Halitosis, or bad breath, and a persistent metallic taste in the mouth
- Gingival recession, resulting in apparent lengthening of teeth. (This may also be caused by heavy-handed brushing or with a stiff tooth brush.)
- Deep pockets between the teeth and the gums (pockets are sites where the attachment has been gradually destroyed by collagen-destroying enzymes, known as collagenases)
- Loose teeth, in the later stages (though this may occur for other reasons as well)
- Drifting of incisors

Gingival inflammation and bone destruction are often painless. Patients sometimes assume that painless bleeding after teeth cleaning is insignificant, although this may be a symptom of progressing chronic periodontitis in that patient.

Subgingival calculus is a frequent finding as well as supragingival calculus due to the bacteria migrating apically and the combined effect of the host response system of the body.

== Diagnosis ==
=== 1999 classification ===
Chronic periodontitis is one of the seven destructive periodontal diseases as listed in the 1999 classification. Not every case of gingivitis will progress onto chronic periodontitis, but all chronic periodontitis results from gingivitis. Therefore it is important to control the first step; gingival inflammation.

A difficulty which arises with diagnosing chronic periodontitis patients is due to the slow and painless progression of the disease. The most effective and timely diagnosis would be during the mild to moderate stage. However, usually when presenting complaints do arise the effects of mobility and alveolar bone loss have become severe.

A full mouth examination and recording is required to document and track periodontal disease including:

- Pocket Depth (PD)
- Clinical Attachment Loss (CAL)
- Bleeding On Probing (BOP)
- Plaque index/score
- Furcation involvement
- Suppuration
- Mobility
- Radiographs

Measuring disease progression is carried out by measuring probing pocket depth (PPD) and bleeding indices using a periodontal probe. Pockets greater than 3mm in depth are considered to be unhealthy. True pocket formation of 4 mm or more are specifically related to chronic periodontitis. Bleeding on probing is considered to be a sign of active disease. Discharge of pus, involvement of the root furcation area and deeper pocketing may all indicate reduced prognosis for an individual tooth.

Evidence of alveolar bone loss is also required to differentiate between true bone loss and not attributions of gingival oedema. Usually, a horizontal pattern of bone loss would be found however, vertical (infrabony) bone loss may also be present on specific sites. A Basic Periodontal Examination (BPE) or Periodontal Screening and Recording (PSR) should give a score of 3 or 4. A correct diagnosis is vital to allow the formation of a specific treatment plan for the patient and to arrest the disease progression.

Chronic periodontitis can be further classified into:

1. Extent (can be either localised affecting < 30% of sites; or generalised if > 30% of sites are affected)
2. Severity (slight = 1–2 mm CAL; moderate = 3–4 mm CAL; severe ≥5 mm CAL)

=== 2017 classification ===
Chronic periodontitis is not included within the newer 2017 World Workshop classification. The 2017 classification of Periodontal Diseases and Conditions includes:

Periodontitis:

1. Necrotizing periodontal diseases
2. Periodontitis
3. Periodontitis as a manifestation of systemic disease

Therefore, in accordance to the 2017 classification, a diagnosis would be achieved through the patient assessment individually on the basis of:

- Type
- Distribution: localised (up to 30% of teeth) or generalised (more than 30% of teeth) and the molar/incisor pattern
- Stage and grading
  - Stages: I (early/mild) with <15% or <2mm interproximal bone loss, II (moderate) with coronal third of root bone loss, III (severe) with mid third of root bone loss, IV (very severe) with apical third of root bone loss
  - Grading: A (slow) with <0.5% bone loss/age, B (moderate) with 0.5-1.0% bone loss/age, C (rapid) with >1.0% bone loss/age
- Status: stable, remission or unstable (see Table 1)
- Risk factors, which include systemic diseases such as diabetes or extrinsic factors such as smoking.

Table 1. Periodontitis status
	Stable	Remission	Unstable
Bleeding on Probing	<10%	≥10%	-
Periodontal Pocket Depth	≤4mm	≤4mm	≥5mm
Bleeding on Probing at 4mm sites	✗	✗	✓

== Treatment ==
There is professional agreement among dentists that smoking cessation and good oral hygiene are key to effective treatment and positive outcomes for patients. Similarly, any plaque retentive factors which exist and are modifiable should be corrected, such as overhangs on restorations.

Treatment can involve both non-surgical and surgical therapies. The typical initial treatment known to be effective is scaling and root planing (SRP) to mechanically debride the depths of the periodontal pocket and disrupt the biofilm present. This is done using a powered ultrasonic or sonic scaler and/or unpowered hand instruments. "In patients with chronic periodontitis, subgingival debridement (in conjunction with supragingival plaque control) is an effective treatment in reducing probing pocket depth and improving the clinical attachment level. In fact it is more effective than supragingival plaque control alone". It is important for patients to be reviewed within 8–12 weeks to assess the treatment response.

Full mouth disinfection protocols are favoured by some clinicians. There is no evidence that full mouth disinfection or full mouth scaling protocols improve the outcome when compared to standard mechanical scaling and root planing.

=== Open flap debridement ===
Open flap debridement is used by some practitioners particularly in deeper pocket areas. The advantages of this approach is better visualization of the root surface to be cleaned. This must be weighed against the risks of surgery. Open flap surgery is more effective than non-surgical periodontal therapy in deep pocketing : "Both scaling and root planing alone and scaling and root planing combined with flap procedure are effective methods for the treatment of chronic periodontitis in terms of attachment level gain and reduction in gingival inflammation. In the treatment of deep pockets open flap debridement results in greater PPD reduction and clinical attachment gain."

=== Guided tissue regeneration ===
Guided tissue regeneration (GTR) using PTFE membranes is favoured by some practitioners, despite its cost and complexity: "GTR has a greater effect on probing measures of periodontal treatment than open flap debridement, including improved attachment gain, reduced pocket depth, less increase in gingival recession and more gain in hard tissue probing at re-entry surgery. However there is marked variability between studies and the clinical relevance of these changes is unknown. As a result, it is difficult to draw general conclusions about the clinical benefit of GTR. Whilst there is evidence that GTR can demonstrate a significant improvement over conventional open flap surgery, the factors affecting outcomes are unclear from the literature and these might include study conduct issues such as bias. Therefore, patients and health professionals need to consider the predictability of the technique compared with other methods of treatment before making final decisions on use."

=== Enamel matrix derivative ===
Enamel matrix derivative (EMD) is favoured by some practitioners despite its high cost: "One year after its application, EMD significantly improved probing attachment levels (1.1 mm) and probing pocket depth reduction (0.9 mm) when compared to a placebo or control, however, the high degree of heterogeneity observed among trials suggests that results have to be interpreted with great caution. In addition, a sensitivity analysis indicated that the overall treatment effect might be overestimated. The actual clinical advantages of using EMD are unknown. With the exception of significantly more postoperative complications in the GTR group, there was no evidence of clinically important differences between GTR and EMD. Bone substitutes may be associated with less gingival recession than EMD."

However, studies have shown that regardless of the conventional periodontal treatments, 20-30% of chronic periodontitis patients do not respond favorably to their treatment. There are many factors which account for these including: ineffective removal of calculus, defective restorations, impaired immune response as a result of a systemic condition, poor plaque control, smoking, etc.

=== Adjunctive systemic antibiotic treatment ===
Systemic antibiotics such as amoxicillin or metronidazole are sometimes used in addition to debridement based treatments.

"Systemic antimicrobials in conjunction with scaling and root planing (SRP), can offer an additional benefit over SRP alone in the treatment of periodontitis, in terms of clinical attachment loss (CAL) and probing pocket depth (PPD) change, and reduced risk of additional CAL loss. However, differences in study methodology and lack of data precluded an adequate and complete pooling of data for a more comprehensive analyses. It was difficult to establish definitive conclusions, although patients with deep pockets, progressive or 'active' disease, or specific microbiological profile, can benefit more from this adjunctive therapy."

There is currently low-quality evidence suggesting if adjunctive systemic antimicrobials are beneficial for the non-surgical treatment of periodontitis. It is not sure whether some antibiotics are better than others when used alongside scaling and root planning).

=== Locally delivered adjunctive antimicrobial treatment ===
Chemical antimicrobials may be used by the clinician to help reduce the bacterial load in the diseased pocket.

"Among the locally administered adjunctive antimicrobials, the most positive results occurred for tetracycline, minocycline, metronidazole, and chlorhexidine. Adjunctive local therapy generally reduced PD levels....Whether such improvements, even if statistically significant, are clinically meaningful remains a question."

Minocycline is typically delivered via slim syringe applicators. Chlorhexidine impregnated chips are also available.

Hydrogen peroxide is a naturally occurring antimicrobial that can be delivered directly to the gingival sulcus or periodontal pocket using a custom formed medical device called a Perio Tray. [Title = Custom Tray Application of Peroxide Gel as an Adjunct to Scaling and Root Planing in the Treatment of Periodontitis: A Randomized, Controlled Three-Month Clinical Trial J Clin Dent 2012; 23:48–56.]

Hydrogen peroxide gel was demonstrated to be effective in controlling the bacteria biofilm [Subgingival Delivery of Oral Debriding Agents: A Proof of Concept J Clin Dent 2011 ;22:149–158] The research shows that a direct application of hydrogen peroxide gel killed virtually all of the bacterial biofilm, was directly and mathematically delivered up to 9mm into periodontal pockets.

=== Modulating the host response ===
Sub-antimicrobial doses of doxycycline (SDD) have been used to alter host response to the periodontal pathogens. This is believed to disrupt the action of matrix metalloproteinases and thus minimise host mediated tissue destruction.

"The adjunctive use of SDD with SRP is statistically more effective than SRP alone in reducing PD and in achieving CAL gain."

== Systemic factors ==
Chronic periodontitis is an inflammatory immune response against the presence of bacteria present. Recent research has suggested that epithelial lining ulceration in chronic periodontal pockets are due to systemic bacterial dissemination and widespread bacterial inflammatory markers present in the host. Two of the most widely investigated systemic diseases associated with chronic periodontitis is diabetes mellitus and cardiovascular disease.

=== Diabetes mellitus ===
Both type 1 and type 2 diabetes have shown a link with the treatment and progression of chronic periodontitis. Chronic periodontitis is more severe in patients that have diabetes than those without, confirming a significant association. With type 2 diabetes patients being shown to have 3.8 times more bone loss and 2.8 times more clinical attachment loss than non-diabetic individuals. With patients with poorly controlled diabetes having a higher risk of alveolar bone loss. Chronic periodontitis can also be a metabolic stressor influencing diabetes control, influencing insulin resistance or becoming a source of inflammatory marker secretion which may strengthen the amount of advanced glycation end product (AGE) mediated cytokine response. Monocytic hyperresponsiveness to bacterial antigen is a biological mechanism that links periodontal disease and diabetes. Increased production of proinflammatory cytokines and mediators cause tissue destruction, attachment loss as well as bone loss causing delayed wound healing.

=== Cardiovascular disease ===
Chronic periodontitis is a marker for cardiovascular disease (CVD). Mechanisms associated with cardiovascular risk are that chronic periodontitis increases inflammatory mediator levels and this may contribute to the onset of CVD, while treatment of chronic periodontitis reduces systemic levels of inflammatory mediators. Certain bacteria found in the periodontal pockets have also been associated to cause atheromatous plaques. Treatment protocol for chronic periodontitis with CVD does not need to be modified as normal periodontal treatment techniques are seen to be effective in CVD patients with additional supportive therapy.

== Costs of treatment ==
"Costs for tooth retention via supportive periodontal therapy are relatively low compared with alternatives (e.g. implants or bridgework) even in periodontally impaired teeth.". However, health outcomes of periodontal therapy are not directly comparable with those from implants or bridgework.

== Research ==
=== Management ===
For adults without severe periodontitis and who get routine dental care, regular scale and polish treatment does not make any difference to gingivitis, probing depths or other oral health-related problems. It seems that there is also no difference in plaque levels.

Lasers are increasingly being used in treatments for chronic periodontitis. However, there is some controversy over their use:

"No consistent evidence supports the efficacy of laser treatment as an adjunct to non-surgical periodontal treatment in adults with chronic periodontitis."

=== Tentative links to other conditions ===
There is little evidence linking progression of periodontal disease to low birth weight or preterm birth:

"In these women with periodontitis and within this study's limitations, disease progression was not associated with an increased risk for delivering a pre-term or a low birthweight infant."

There is recently emerged evidence linking chronic periodontitis with head and neck squamous cell carcinoma: "Patients with periodontitis were more likely to have poorly differentiated oral cavity SCC than those without periodontitis (32.8% versus 11.5%; P = 0.038)".
