= Clinical attachment loss =

Peridontal assessment parameter measuring loss of connective tissue support

Clinical attachment level
- Synonyms: Clinical attachment loss
- Purpose: Assessment of periodontal attachment and periodontal support
- Test of: Periodontal attachment loss
- Based on: Periodontal probing measurement relative to the cementoenamel junction

Clinical attachment level (CAL) is a clinical measurement used in periodontology to determine the position of the periodontal attachment relative to a fixed anatomical landmark on the tooth, usually the cementoenamel junction (CEJ). It is a fundamental parameter for assessing the severity and progression of periodontal disease, monitoring treatment outcomes, and evaluating changes in periodontal support over time. Clinical attachment loss refers to the pathological loss of periodontal attachment, which is quantified by the clinical attachment level. Unlike probing depth alone, clinical attachment level accounts for changes in the position of the gingival margin, providing a more accurate assessment of periodontal attachment loss.

== Difference between CAL and probing pocket depth (PPD) ==
=== Probing pocket depth (PPD) ===
Pocket depth is the distance from the gingival margin to the base of the pocket. The position of the gingival margin can change due to swelling or recession, and vary with inflammation if force of probing, therefore, probing depth measurement alone is not recommended for assessment of changes in periodontal support over time.

=== Clinical attachment level ===
The clinical attachment level (CAL) combines the measurements of probing pocket depth and any gingival recession to give an overall indication of where the periodontal tissues attach to the root surface. It is measured from a constant reference point, usually the CEJ, to the base of the periodontal pocket. Due to the more stable and reproducible property, this is considered the best measure of changes in residual periodontal support over time.

Feature	Clinical Attachment Level (CAL)	Probing Pocket Depth (PPD)
Reference point	Cementoenamel junction (fixed anatomic landmark)	Gingival margin (can change over time)
Indication	True attachment loss	Current pocket depth only
Affected by gingival swelling/recession?	No	Yes
Best for	Diagnosis, disease progression	Routine clinical measurement
stability	More stable	Can vary with inflammation and probing force. If the gingiva is swollen and above the CEJ, PPD may increase even if no attachment loss has occurred. If the gingiva recedes, PPD may be small, but CAL is large.

== Calculation of CAL ==
CAL is measured in mm as the distance from the CEJ to the gingival margin (GM), using a periodontal probe. This provides an estimate of the true periodontal support and is used for monitoring changes in periodontal support over time. CAL is easily measured when CEJ is exposed / visible. CAL can also be calculated following the formula CAL (mm) = PPD (mm) + GR (mm)

Calculation of CAL can be categorized into different clinical situations, depending on the position and level of the gingival margin.

=== 1. Gingival margin is apical to the CEJ (gingival recession) ===
The gingival margin has moved apically, exposing part of the root surface and CEJ, indicating gingival recession.

CAL calculation = Probing Depth (PD) + Recession

=== 2. Gingival margin is at the level of CEJ, and the CEJ is just visible ===
There is no recession, no enlargement, representing “zero displacement” from CEJ.

CAL calculation = CAL = PD

=== 3. Gingival margin is in its normal/natural position up to 3mm coronal to the CEJ ===
CAL = PA - distance from the gingival margin to the CEJ

=== 4. Gingival margin is significantly coronal to the CEJ due to enlargement ===
The gingival margin is far above the CEJ, more than the normal 0-3mm, suggesting gingival enlargement

CAL calculation = CAL = PD - amount of coronal displacement

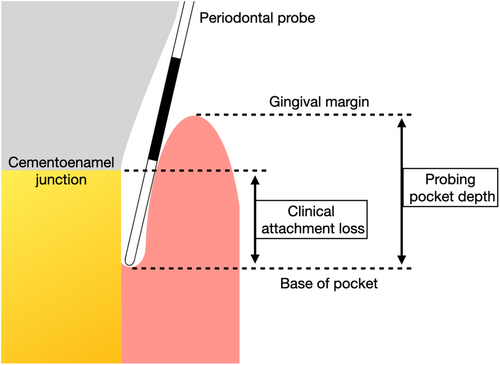
Diagram representing periodontal probing assessments made during the examination in order to make a diagnosis of periodontal health status.

== Where is CAL measured? ==
Usually at six sites per tooth: mesiobuccal, midbuccal, distobuccal, mesiolingual, midlingual, distolingual

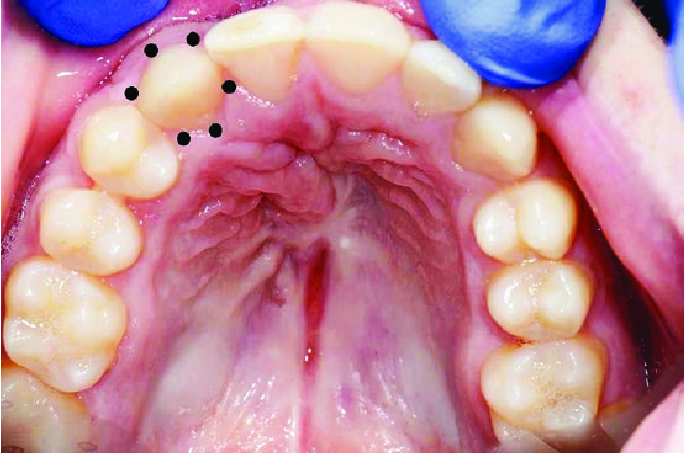
The six sites (b = buccal, db = disto-buccal, dl = disto-lingual, l = lingual, mb = mesio-buccal, and ml = mesio-lingual) of periodontal pocket depth and bleeding on probing measurements.

== Periodontal anatomy review ==
=== 1. Gingiva ===
The gingiva is the visible soft-tissue component of the periodontium and forms a biological seal around the cervical region of the teeth, protecting the underlying periodontal structures from mechanical trauma and microbial invasion.

- Unattached/marginal/free gingiva

The free gingiva is the unattached coronal portion of the gingival tissue that surrounds the tooth in a collar-like fashion. In a healthy periodontium, it measures approximately 1 mm in width and is not directly bound to the underlying alveolar bone.

- Gingival sulcus

The gingival sulcus is a shallow crevice located between the tooth surface and the marginal gingiva. In clinically healthy gingiva, its depth typically ranges from 1 to 3 mm, reflecting the integrity of the dentogingival attachment apparatus.

- Attached gingiva

The attached gingiva represents the apical continuation of the marginal gingiva. It is firm, resilient, and immobile due to its dense connective tissue attachment to the periosteum of the alveolar bone. The width of attached gingiva varies depending on tooth position and plays an important role in maintaining periodontal health.

- Interdental gingiva

The interdental gingiva occupies the gingival embrasure between adjacent teeth. In a healthy state, it assumes a pyramidal or papillary shape, influenced by the position of the proximal contact point and the contour of the teeth involved.

- Dentogingival junction

The dentogingival junction consists of three epithelial components: the gingival epithelium, which covers the external gingival surface; the sulcular epithelium, which lines the gingival sulcus; and the junctional epithelium (JE), which forms a specialized epithelial attachment between the gingiva and the tooth surface.

The junctional epithelium is of particular importance in assessing clinical attachment level (CAL). In periodontal health, the JE is located at or near the cemento-enamel junction (CEJ). In periodontitis, inflammatory processes lead to apical migration of the JE along the root surface, which represents true loss of periodontal attachment.

=== 2. Periodontal ligament ===
The periodontal ligament is a specialized, vascular, and cellular connective tissue occupying the space between the cementum of the tooth root and the alveolar bone socket. It is primarily composed of dense collagen fiber bundles, known as Sharpey's fibers, which anchor the tooth to the surrounding alveolar bone.

Functionally, the periodontal ligament acts as a shock absorber during mastication, provides proprioceptive sensory input, and contributes to the nutritional and reparative capacity of the periodontal tissues. In periodontitis, progressive destruction of periodontal ligament fibers occurs in association with apical migration of the junctional epithelium, resulting in increased tooth mobility.

=== 3. Cementum ===
Cementum is a thin, calcified, avascular connective tissue that covers the root surface of the tooth. Its primary function is to serve as an attachment medium for periodontal ligament collagen fibers, thereby securing the tooth within the alveolar socket.

Under normal conditions, cementum is located subgingivally and is not exposed to the oral environment. However, gingival recession associated with periodontal disease may expose cementum, increasing the risk of dentinal hypersensitivity and root caries.

=== 4. Alveolar bone (alveolar process) ===
The alveolar bone forms part of the maxilla and mandible and provides the osseous support for the teeth by forming their sockets. Its structure and density are maintained by functional forces transmitted through the periodontal ligament.

In periodontitis, inflammatory mediators released during the host immune response stimulate osteoclastic activity, leading to alveolar bone resorption. This irreversible loss of supporting bone is a hallmark of clinical attachment loss and represents the most significant structural consequence of periodontal disease.

== Structures involved in clinical attachment loss ==
Clinical attachment loss refers to the apical migration and destruction of the tissues that secure the tooth within the periodontium. This process involves the coordinated breakdown of epithelial, connective tissue, and osseous components that collectively form the periodontal attachment apparatus.

=== 1. Junctional epithelium ===
In clinical attachment loss, the junctional epithelium migrates apically along the root surface in response to chronic inflammation. As this epithelial attachment shifts downward, it defines the base of a periodontal pocket, which represents the clinical expression of attachment loss.

=== 2. Supracrestal connective tissue ===
The supracrestal connective tissue comprises collagen fiber systems that contribute to the stability of the gingival attachment. During clinical attachment loss, these fibers undergo enzymatic degradation mediated by host inflammatory responses. Loss of this connective tissue attachment disrupts the physiologic gingival seal, facilitating subgingival biofilm colonization and promoting apical extension of the inflammatory lesion.

=== 3. Cementum ===
In periodontal breakdown associated with attachment loss, previously covered cementum surfaces become exposed to the oral environment. As periodontal ligament fiber insertions are destroyed, cementum loses its functional connective tissue anchorage, leaving the root surface vulnerable and biologically altered.

=== 4. Periodontal ligament ===
The periodontal ligament is the principal connective tissue structure anchoring the tooth to the surrounding alveolar bone. During clinical attachment loss, the collagen fiber bundles are progressively destroyed. The most apical extent of the remaining periodontal ligament shifts downward along the root surface, corresponding directly to the measured level of clinical attachment loss.

=== 5. Alveolar bone ===
In advanced stages of attachment loss, inflammation-mediated bone resorption reduces alveolar crest height. This bone loss may present as horizontal or angular defects, compromising periodontal ligament support and further accelerating clinical attachment loss.

== Clinical significance ==
Clinical attachment loss is one of the three characteristic factors of periodontitis. In clinical practice, CAL is the primary feature assessed to diagnose periodontitis.

Periodontitis is diagnosed when

- CAL interdentally is >2mm on at least 2 non-adjacent teeth
- CAL buccally/orally is >3mm with pocket depths of >3mm on at least two teeth.

As periodontitis is not the sole cause of clinical attachment loss, any CAL attributed to the following factors is not considered during diagnosis.

- Trauma
- Dental caries extending cervically
- Malposition/Extraction of third molar
- Endodontic Lesion draining through marginal periodontium
- Vertical Root Fracture

=== Severity (staging) and progression (grading) ===
The most recent (2017) periodontal disease classification uses CAL as a major factor in assessing both Severity and Progression. Alongside other factors like radiographic bone loss and tooth loss. CAL correlates to severity (Staging) as follows.

- Stage I: 1-2mm CAL
- Stage II : 3-4mm CAL
- Stage III/IV : >5mm CAL

An increase in CAL is considered direct evidence of progression (Grading) as follows

- Grade A: No change in CAL over the past 5 years
- Grade B: <2mm increase in CAL over the past 5 years
- Grade C: ≥2mm increase in CAL over the past 5 years

=== Management ===
Periodontal therapy focuses primarily on preventing further attachment loss and managing its consequences. Because attachment loss itself is permanent and cannot be reduced, patients who present with CAL are considered lifelong periodontitis patients.

Successful periodontal therapy aims to restore the stability of the periodontium, which is accomplished when gingival inflammation ceases and is not reliant on CAL.

Clinical Attachment Loss
- Other names: Level / Loss of Attachment (LOA)
- Specialty: Periodontology

Clinical attachment level (CAL), also known as clinical attachment loss, is a periodontal parameter used to determine the position of the periodontal supporting tissues in relation to a fixed point on the tooth, which is the cementoenamel junction (CEJ). Clinical attachment level represents the loss or gain of attachment that occurs due to periodontal disease, treatment, or other conditions such as recession or inflammation.

=== Difference between CAL and probing pocket depth (PPD) ===
==== Probing pocket depth (PPD) ====
Pocket depth is the distance from the gingival margin to the base of the pocket. The position of the gingival margin can change due to swelling or recession, and vary with inflammation if force of probing, therefore, probing depth measurement alone is not recommended for assessment of changes in periodontal support over time.

==== Clinical attachment level ====
The clinical attachment level (CAL) combines the measurements of probing pocket depth and any gingival recession to give an overall indication of where the periodontal tissues attach to the root surface. It is measured from a constant reference point, usually the CEJ, to the base of the periodontal pocket. Due to the more stable and reproducible property, this is considered the best measure of changes in residual periodontal support over time.

Feature	Clinical Attachment Level (CAL)	Probing Pocket Depth (PPD)
Reference point	Cementoenamel junction (fixed anatomic landmark)	Gingival margin (can change over time)
Indication	True attachment loss	Current pocket depth only
Affected by gingival swelling/recession?	No	Yes
Best for	Diagnosis, disease progression	Routine clinical measurement
stability	More stable	Can vary with inflammation and probing force. If the gingiva is swollen and above the CEJ, PPD may increase even if no attachment loss has occurred. If the gingiva recedes, PPD may be small, but CAL is large.

== Differentiation of conditions ==
Clinical attachment loss (CAL) is a critical parameter in periodontal diagnosis, as it reflects true periodontal tissue destruction. However, increased probing depth does not always indicate attachment loss. Conditions such as pseudopockets and gingival enlargement can mimic periodontal pockets clinically, leading to diagnostic confusion. This part of the article discusses CAL in comparison with pseudopockets and gingival enlargement, highlighting their pathogenesis, clinical features, and diagnostic significance.

=== 1. CAL vs. Pseudopocket ===
Clinical attachment loss refers to the loss of periodontal attachment due to apical migration of the junctional epithelium (JE), accompanied by destruction of gingival connective tissue fibers and periodontal ligament fibers. This results in the formation of a true periodontal pocket, where the base of the pocket lies apical to the cementoenamel junction (CEJ). CAL develops through a complex host–microbial interaction, beginning with microbial dysbiosis, commonly involving anaerobic pathogens such as Porphyromonas gingivalis. This dysbiotic biofilm triggers an exaggerated host immune response, characterized by neutrophil infiltration, pro-inflammatory cytokine release, and complement activation.

With chronic inflammation, destructive enzymes such as matrix metalloproteinases are activated, leading to the breakdown of gingival connective tissue fibers and detachment from the cementum. This allows the JE to migrate apically, deepening the periodontal pocket and facilitating further bacterial invasion. Simultaneously, inflammatory mediators stimulate RANKL-mediated osteoclast activation, resulting in alveolar bone resorption. Biologically, this process is irreversible, involving permanent breakdown of the JE, connective tissue fibers, periodontal ligament, and supporting bone. Clinically, CAL is the gold standard for diagnosing periodontitis and marks the transition from gingivitis to established periodontal disease.

In contrast, a pseudopocket is characterized by increased probing depth without attachment loss. It represents a false pocket, where the apparent deepening of the sulcus occurs due to coronal displacement of the gingival margin rather than apical migration of the JE. Pseudopockets develop primarily from inflammatory gingival edema or hyperplasia, most often secondary to plaque accumulation. Inflammation causes vascular congestion and collagen breakdown within the gingival connective tissue, resulting in swollen, soft, and puffy gingiva that bulges coronally.

In pseudopockets, the JE remains at its normal position at the CEJ, and the connective tissue attachment remains intact. There is no alveolar bone loss, and the increased probing depth is solely due to gingival swelling. Clinically, pseudopockets are considered an early and reversible stage of periodontal disease, typically associated with gingivitis. However, if plaque accumulation persists, pseudopockets may progress to true periodontal pockets with CAL.

=== 2. CAL vs. Gingival Enlargement ===
While CAL represents true periodontal destruction, gingival enlargement refers to an increase in the size of the gingival tissues, which may or may not be associated with attachment loss. In CAL, the gingival margin often migrates apically, leading to gingival recession and increased CEJ–JE distance. The probing depth increases due to a combination of attachment loss and bone loss, and the CEJ is usually clinically visible.

Gingival enlargement, on the other hand, usually results in a false pocket, as the gingival margin moves coronally and covers the CEJ. The probing depth increases due to tissue overgrowth rather than periodontal attachment loss. Attachment and bone loss are typically absent unless gingival enlargement coexists with periodontitis.

The pathogenesis of gingival enlargement varies depending on the underlying cause. Inflammatory gingival enlargement is commonly associated with plaque, calculus, ill-fitting restorations, orthodontic appliances, or fractured teeth. The gingiva may appear red or bluish, soft, friable, and may become firm if the condition becomes chronic. Drug-induced gingival enlargement is commonly associated with anticonvulsants such as phenytoin, immunosuppressants like cyclosporine, and calcium channel blockers such as nifedipine. These cases typically present as firm, pink, bead-like gingiva, often more prominent in the anterior regions.

Genetic or syndromic gingival enlargement, such as Zimmermann-Laband or Ramon syndrome, presents as firm, fibrotic, and persistent nodular gingival overgrowth that usually begins around tooth eruption. Systemic or hormonal causes, including pregnancy, hormonal imbalance, leukemia, granulomatosis with polyangiitis (strawberry gingivitis), and vitamin C deficiency, can also result in gingival enlargement. In rare cases, gingival enlargement may be neoplastic, such as in squamous cell carcinoma or fibroma.

Clinically, gingival enlargement often obscures the CEJ, and the gingival margin appears coronally positioned. Unlike CAL, gingival enlargement is often reversible or manageable once the underlying cause is addressed, though surgical correction may be required in fibrotic or genetic cases.

=== 3. Clinical Examples: CAL vs Pseudopocket vs Gingival Enlargement ===
Patients with clinical attachment loss typically present with features of chronic periodontitis. A common example is a middle-aged adult with deep true periodontal pockets, gingival recession, tooth mobility, furcation involvement, and radiographic evidence of alveolar bone loss. Another example includes localized attachment loss due to aggressive toothbrushing, presenting as cervical recession with exposed CEJ and true pocket formation. Key identifying features include irreversible attachment loss, apical migration of the JE, and true periodontal pocket formation.

Pseudopockets are commonly seen in younger patients with plaque-induced gingivitis. For example, a teenager may present with swollen, edematous gingiva, probing depths of 6–10 mm, a hidden CEJ, and no radiographic bone loss. Similarly, patients with orthodontic brackets may develop localized gingival swelling around brackets, resulting in 5–7 mm probing depths without attachment loss. These cases are characterized by false pockets, increased probing depth due solely to gingival swelling, and reversibility with proper plaque control.

Gingival enlargement presents differently depending on etiology. Drug-induced cases, such as in patients taking phenytoin or nifedipine, show bulbous, firm, bead-like gingiva with buried CEJs and minimal bleeding on probing. Hormonal enlargement, such as pregnancy epulis, appears as localized, red, soft, and friable gingival masses with partially hidden CEJs and increased sulcus depth. Genetic gingival enlargement presents in children with firm, fibrotic, generalized gingival overgrowth beginning around tooth eruption, often requiring surgical management. These cases are identified by tissue overgrowth-related pseudopocket formation and generally intact periodontal attachment.
