= Red complex =

Group of bacteria

The red complex is a group of bacteria that are categorized together based on their association with severe forms of periodontal disease. The red complex—among a number of other complexes—were classified by Sigmund Socransky in 1998.

The three members of the red complex are:

1. Porphyromonas gingivalis
2. Tannerella forsythia
3. Treponema denticola
