= Full mouth disinfection =

Dental treatment for periodontitis

Full mouth disinfection typically refers to an intense course of treatment for periodontitis typically involving scaling and root planing in combination with adjunctive use of local antimicrobial adjuncts to periodontal treatment such as chlorhexidine in various ways of application. The aim is to complete debridement of all periodontal pocket areas within a short time frame such as 24 hours, in order to minimize the chance of reinfection of the pockets with pathogens coming from other oral niches like the tongue, tonsils and non-treated periodontal pockets.

Eberhard (2022) published a Cochrane review (systematic review and meta-analysis) which found modest benefit for full mouth disinfection, but the superiority (or otherwise) of the intervention had not at the time of review been conclusively demonstrated. Current recommendations support its use as equal and equivalent to other established effective treatment modalities.
