= Periodontitis as a manifestation of systemic disease =

Type of gum disease

Periodontitis as a manifestation of systemic diseases is one of the seven categories of periodontitis as defined by the American Academy of Periodontology 1999 classification system and is one of the three classifications of periodontal diseases and conditions within the 2017 classification. At least 16 systemic diseases have been linked to periodontitis. These systemic diseases are associated with periodontal disease because they generally contribute to either a decreased host resistance to infections or dysfunction in the connective tissue of the gums, increasing patient susceptibility to inflammation-induced destruction.
These secondary periodontal inflammations should not be confused with other conditions in which an epidemiological association with periodontitis was revealed, but no causative connection was proved yet. Such conditions are coronary heart diseases, cerebrovascular diseases and erectile dysfunction.

== Conditions associated with periodontitis ==
- Diabetes mellitus
  - Recent evidence suggests that, similar to diabetes mellitus, individuals with impaired fasting glucose have higher degree of periodontal inflammation.
- Associated with hematologic disorders:
  - Acquired neutropenia
  - Leukemia

For those patients with periodontitis as a manifestation of hematologic disorders, coordination with the patient's physician is instrumental in planning periodontal treatment. Therapy should be avoided during periods of exacerbation of the malignancy or during active phases of chemotherapy, and antimicrobial therapy might be considered when urgent treatment must be performed when granulocyte counts are low.

- Associated with genetic disorders
  - Familial and cyclic neutropenia
  - Down syndrome
  - Leukocyte adhesion deficiency disorder
  - Papillon–Lefèvre syndrome
  - Chédiak–Higashi syndrome
  - Langerhans cell disease (histiocytosis syndromes)
  - Glycogen storage disease
  - Chronic granulomatous disease
  - Infantile genetic agranulocytosis
  - Cohen syndrome
  - Ehlers–Danlos syndrome (Types IV and VIII)
  - Hypophosphatasia
  - Crohn's disease (inflammatory bowel disease)
  - Marfan syndrome
  - Klinefelter syndrome
