= Plaque hypotheses =

Theories concerning the role of dental plaque bacteria in mouth health conditions

Plaque hypotheses are theories to explain the role of plaque bacteria in dental caries and in periodontal disease. They rely heavily on the postulates of Koch (formulated in 1884) and on the work of Louis Pasteur (1822–1895). Changing perceptions have altered treatment models.

The hypotheses have sought to establish both in caries and in periodontitis a relation between pathogen virulence, environmental considerations, plaque biofilm structure and the host response.

== Specific plaque hypothesis ==
The specific plaque hypothesis was the favoured opinion at the birth of microbiology in the late nineteenth century. It posited that there were some specific pathogenic bacteria among the oral microbiome which were solely responsible for disease, and in the absence of which the oral environment would be healthy. The hypothesis states that the severity of the disease depends upon the amount of plaque accumulation. Even though it is an old concept, most of the current periodontal treatment strategies still depend on it. It was later realised that disease occurred even in the absence of these bacteria, albeit to a lesser degree, which observation gave rise to the non-specific hypothesis. Further research on the specific organisms involved and their pathogenicity gave rise to a resurgence of the idea in the 1990s, but it has since been modified.

=== Caries ===
The specific plaque hypothesis was originally the theory that specific pathogens alone were capable of causing caries. However, the theory is proscribed by the fact that caries occurs even in the absence of these bacteria, albeit to a lesser degree. Despite this, the hypothesis was useful in diagnosis and treatment, associating caries with such truly cariogenic bacteria as Streptococcus mutans and the lactobacilli species.

=== Periodontitis ===
The specific plaque hypothesis was introduced by Loesche, following on from observations that rodents did not develop caries even with a highly cariogenic diet unless specific bacteria such as streptococci were introduced. It is understood that specific microorganisms play an importance in both caries and periodontal diseases.

== Non-specific plaque hypothesis ==
=== Caries ===
The non-specific plaque hypothesis is the theory developed in the 1930s that caries is the result of the combined efforts of all the organisms in the oral biome, and that some patients are merely more susceptible than others. No specific organisms had been identified at that point that were more cariogenic than others. Thus the amount of plaque in situ was taken to determine the severity of the effect, regardless of its composition. While this is to a degree true of periodontitis, it could not be proven of caries. Early thoughts of oral caries disease could not be identified to a type of bacteria responsible due to limited technological development in the nineteenth century, which led to the Non-Specific Plaque Hypotheses. Evolving in the 1980s, not only were a few specific types of bacteria identified as playing a part in disease, differences in virulences of bacteria were then considered as part of the theory that the overall entirety of the microflora could lead to caries disease.

The non-specific plaque hypothesis was developed in the nineteenth century, and postulates that the accumulation of activity of all types of dental plaque is responsible for oral disease, regardless of the virulence of the specific pathogens involved. Technological developments in the twentieth century enabled scientists to analyse the chemical changes in the plaque biome from healthy to diseased environments, which then brought several problems to light. The recently posited keystone-pathogen hypothesis holds that certain malignant pathogens can control the inflammatory disease by proliferating, remodelling and disproportionate a normally benign microbiome.

=== Periodontitis ===
The non specific plaque hypothesis was introduced in the 1930s. Studies conducted were unable to identify a specific organism responsible for the formation of periodontal disease, and therefore was unable to support the specific plaque hypothesis. This new theory stated that all bacteria flora in plaque had a role in periodontal destruction. During this time, it was believed that periodontal therapy involved complete plaque control and not just targeting specific bacteria. If plaque control was achieved, then it would limit the production of gingival (gum) irritants, thereby decreasing inflammation and periodontal destruction.

== Ecological plaque hypothesis ==
The ecological or keystone plaque hypothesis is that a shift in the ecology of the oral biome results in an imbalance and exorbitantly high numbers of certain keystone pathogens.

=== Caries ===
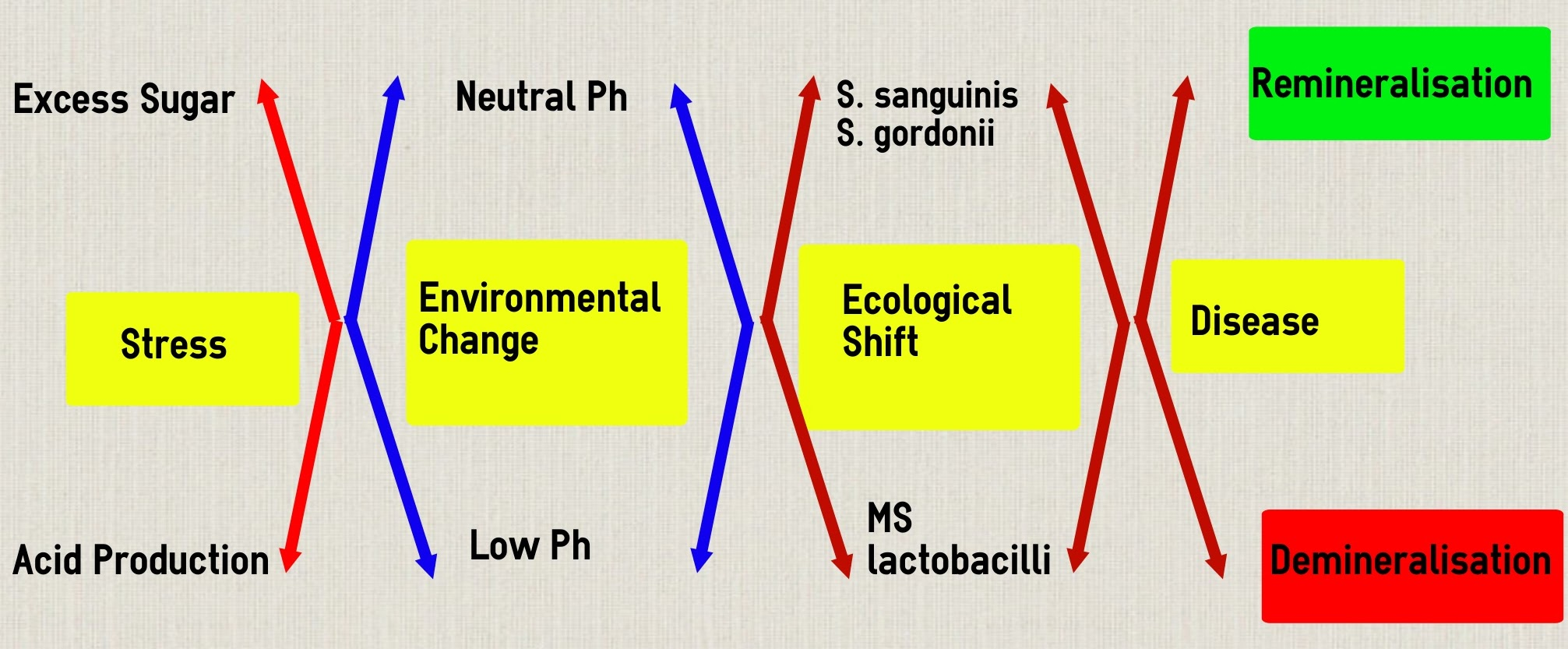
Ecological plaque hypothesis and the aetiology of dental caries

The ecological plaque hypothesis, a combination of the two previously mentioned hypotheses, suggests that there are certain species responsible for pathology, but are present in insufficient quantities to cause damage to a healthy individual. Thus biofilm derived diseases are the result of an imbalance in the normal oral ecology.

The most commonly recognised bacteria that are responsible for initiating the biofilm formation that can eventually lead to caries are streptococcus mutans and lactobacillus. The key factors for virulence include their ability to metabolise glucose and similar sugars, their tolerance for a low pH environment, and their acidogenicity. The presence of streptococci encourage adherence of more cariogenic bacteria, which in turn increases the likelihood for caries. Although factors such as the quality of saliva, using fluoridated toothpaste and chewing gum after meals can inhibit the growth of these bacteria and change the biofilm environment. Saliva containing more buffering agents such as calcium and phosphate ions alter the internal environment of dental plaque to become less acidic, favouring the growth of less cariogenic organisms. The fluoride components of fluoridated toothpaste can be bacteriostatic to cariogenic bacteria, decreasing their acidogenicity and proliferation. Chewing gum can disturb the mature and fairly stable acid producing plaque to alter the bacterial composition of the biofilm. In turn the disease causing organisms may still be present, but are so in reduced numbers. Chewing gum containing sufficient levels of xylitol also has the ability to reduce the number of streptococcus mutans present in the saliva as well as the mechanisms for the bacteria to adhere to tooth tissue, which reduces the chance for reinfection.

=== Periodontitis ===
Inc. red complex; avoid immune detection; devour host for nutrition. Interfere with host immune response Trigger environ changes to make it more benign for them

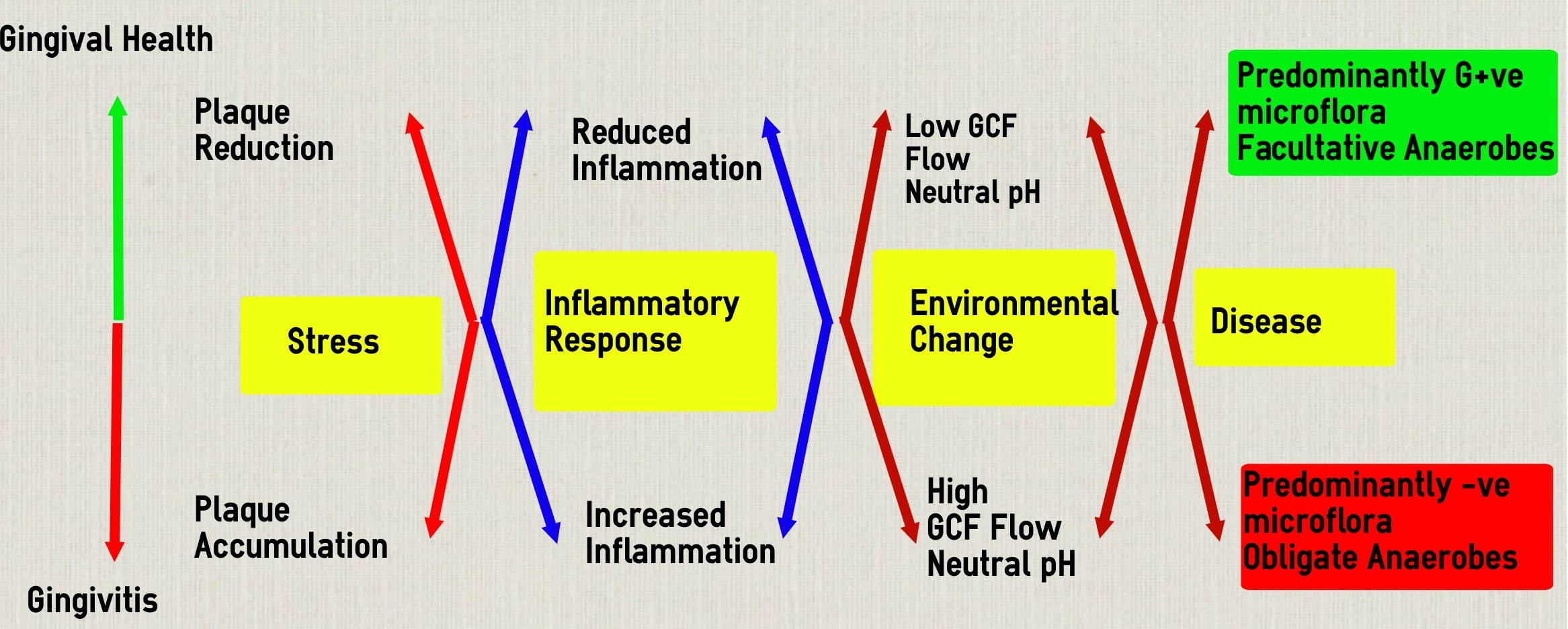
The ecological plaque hypothesis and the aetiology of periodontal diseases

The ecological concept consolidates both specific and non specific plaque hypothesis theories. The ecological plaque hypothesis, founded in the early 1990s by Marsh (1994), confirmed some associations between clinical and laboratory measurements. This theory focused its sites that the environment in which balance the microflora may in fact be altered by many changes in the resident plaque and specific species which can predispose the site to periodontal disease.

Keystone-Pathogen Hypothesis
The term keystone is also used in biology to characterise a species which has a disproportionate effect on the ecosystem when compared to its size. The keystone concept is in contrast with the dominant species concept, whereby the influence on the system is the absolute size of the species.

If this concept is transposed to the microbiology world, it is thought that certain low abundance pathogenic bacteria can play a disproportionate role in modulating the host response by remodeling a typically favorable microbiota into a harmful one.
