= Sigmund Socransky =

Dental demonstrator and Periodontolgist

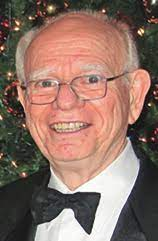
Sigmund Socransky

Sigmund Socransky was born on December 2, 1934, in Toronto, Canada. He received his DDS degree from the University of Toronto in 1957. Socransky studied microbiology and Periodontology at Harvard, receiving a certificate in 1961. That same year he was recruited to work as a research associate at the Forsyth Dental Center. In 1968, he was nominated Senior Member of the Staff and Head of the Department of Periodontology. During his 50-year career at Forsyth, he published over 300 manuscripts. His career focus was in the fields of Periodontology and oral microbiology. Socransky died on August 27, 2011, in Boston Massachusetts.

== The "Complex Theory" ==
In 1998, Socransky developed the “complex theory” where periodontal pathogens are categorized based on their association with the severity of disease. In the complex theory, periodontal pathogens are identified and classified by color to indicate which bacteria are associated with the onset and progression of periodontal disease. The classification includes the red complex, orange complex, green complex, orange-associated complex, and Aa complex.

Bacteria in the green and orange-associated complexes are considered early colonizers. They adhere to the pellicle and are necessary for the colonization of other bacteria associated with periodontal disease.

== Socransky’s Criteria ==
In 1890, Robert Koch developed a list of criteria to determine whether a specific bacterium was the cause of a given disease. Today we refer to that criterion as Koch’s postulates. The criteria to determine a true pathogen according to Koch’s postulates includes:

1. The microorganism must be found in abundance in all organisms suffering from the disease but should not be found in healthy organisms.
2. The microorganism must be isolated from a diseased organism and grown in pure culture.
3. The cultured microorganism should cause disease when introduced into a healthy organism.
4. The microorganism must be isolated again from the inoculated, diseased experimental host and identified as being identical to the original specific causative agent.

After reading through the criteria, Socransky determined that periodontal pathogens were not true pathogens, according to Koch’s postulates. Therefore, Socransky proposed a modified version to differentiate between commensal and opportunistic bacteria associated with periodontal disease. These criteria include:

1. A pathogen should be found more frequently and in higher numbers in disease states than in healthy states.
2. Elimination of the pathogen should be accompanied by elimination or remission of the disease.
3. There should be evidence of host response to a specific pathogen that is causing tissue damage.
4. Properties of a putative pathogen that may function to damage the host tissues should be demonstrated.
5. The ability of a putative pathogen to function in producing disease should be demonstrated in an animal model.

At the time, Socransky’s criteria acknowledged that some of the bacteria − previously thought to be pathogenic − were commensal in certain hosts. In addition, this criterion brought to light the host response, which was not addressed in Koch’s postulates.

== Recognition ==
Socransky was the recipient of the American Association for Dental, Oral, and Craniofacial Research's highest honor, the Distinguished Scientist Award. In honor of Socransky's contribution to Periodontal Research, the Periodontal Research Group of the International Association for Dental Research (IADR) makes an annual award to young, promising investigators who have contributed significantly to periodontal biological and/or clinical research.
