= Periodontal pathogen =

Organisms that contribute to gum disease

== I. What are Periodontal Pathogens? ==
Periodontal pathogens are particular microorganisms, primarily bacteria, that inhabit the subgingival biofilm and facilitate the onset and advancement of periodontal disease. Aggregatibacter actinomycetemcomitans, Fusobacterium nucleatum, Treponema denticola, Porphyromonas gingivalis, and Tannerella forsythia are some of the primary periodontal pathogens.

There are hundreds of sorts of bacteria in the mouth, but only a tiny percentage of them are regarded as "pathogenic". The biggest difference between them is how they interact with the host. As an instance, commensal microbiota, which are mostly Gram-positive facultative anaerobes like Streptococcus and Actinomyces species, reside in the mouth when it is healthy. These microbiota exist in symbiotic relationships with the host and often confer "colonisation resistance" by inhibiting the adhesion of more virulent species. The transition of periodontal bacteria from harmless commensals to disease-causing pathogens is best explained by the Ecological Plaque Hypothesis and the Polymicrobial Synergy and Dysbiosis Model (also known as the synergistic-symbiogenesis concept). These models suggest that pathogenicity is not determined solely by the presence of specific bacteria, but by their ability to disrupt the local microbial balance, modify the surrounding environment, and manipulate the host immune response. While commensals help maintain an oxidation-reduction potential that favors health, periodontal pathogens are typically saccharolytic, proteolytic, and obligate anaerobes.

These pathogens cause disease by breaking down tissues directly (through enzymes like collagenases and proteases) and, more importantly, by triggering dysbiosis. A "keystone pathogen" like Porphyromonas gingivalis can subvert the innate immune system, transforming a normally benign biofilm into a dysbiotic one. This triggers a self-amplifying loop of hyper-inflammation where the host's own matrix metalloproteinases (MMPs) and osteoclast activity lead to the clinical hallmarks of attachment loss and alveolar bone resorption.

== II. How Pathogens Cause Periodontal Disease? ==
The progression of periodontal disease entails a transition from a state of symbiotic health to a chronic, immunoinflammatory-mediated degradation of the supporting structures. The first step in this process is the buildup of dental plaque, which is a complex biofilm made up of bacteria that stick to the pellicle-covered tooth surface through specific adhesins. As this biofilm gets more mature, it goes through a microbial succession, starting with early Gram-positive colonisers and ending with highly organised, late-colonizing anaerobes that cause the host to respond.

The initial stage is gingivitis, characterized by a localized inflammation of the gums due to the metabolic byproducts of the biofilm. At this point, the inflammatory infiltrate is solely in the gingival soft tissue, and the damage can be reversed. However, if the microbial challenge continues to persist and the biofilm becomes dysbiotic, the condition could get progressively worse and develop into periodontitis. This transformation is marked by the breakdown of the collagen matrix in the gingival connective tissue, which is mostly carried out by host enzymes like matrix metalloproteinases (MMPs), which is a family of zinc-dependent endopeptidases that degrade extracellular matrix (ECM) components.

As the interaction between bacteria and the body's immune system becomes more intense, the body's natural defense reaction may start to harm its own tissues. In response to this microbial challenge, harmful bacteria and their toxins, such as lipopolysaccharides (LPS), trigger the release of inflammatory mediators including prostaglandin E2 (PGE2), interleukin-1 beta (IL-1β), and tumor necrosis factor-alpha (TNF-α). Although these molecules are intended to help in defending against infection, chronic and severe inflammation can cause the periodontal ligament to break down and induce the RANK/RANKL/OPG pathway. This increases osteoclast activity, which contributes to alveolar bone resorption (one of the main irreversible characteristics of periodontitis), which may ultimately weaken the stability and support of teeth.

== III. Classification of Periodontal Pathogens ==
Socransky's Microbial Complexes, the major periodontal pathogens classification system developed by Sigmund Socransky in 1998, has been widely recognized as an important milestone to understand the microbial composition associated with oral health. The bacteria groups in the oral cavity were categorized based on the subgingival sites of periodontal diseases and healthy conditions, including patients with and without periodontitis.

Six closely associated groups of bacterial species were recognized,

Complex	Bacterial Cluster
Red	Treponema denticola, Porphyromonas gingivalis, Tannerella forsythensis
Orange	Fusobacterium nucleatum, Prevotella intermedia, Prevotella nigrescens, Peptostreptococcus micros
	Eubacterium nodatum, Campylobacter rectus, Campylobacter showae, Streptococcus constellatus, Campylobacter gracilis
Yellow	Streptococcus sanguis, Streptococcus oralis, Streptococcus mitis, Streptococcus gordonii, Streptococcus intermedius
Green	Capnocytophaga, Campylobacter concisus, Eikenella corrodens, Actinobacillus actinomycetemcomitans (serotype a)
Purple	Veillonella parvula, Actinomyces odontolyticus, Actinobacillus actinomycetemcomitans (serotype b), Selenomonas noxia, Actinomyces naeslundii

There are 3 complexes categorized as early colonizers of the tooth surface, which usually precedes the multiplication of predominantly gram-negative orange and red complexes:

- yellow complex
- green complex
- purple complex bacteria.

Whilst there are 2 complexes comprising the species which are the major aetiologic agents of periodontal diseases.

- Orange complex
- Red complex

== 3.1 Red Complex Bacteria (Highly Pathogenic) ==
Red complex bacteria, as one of the major etiologic agents of periodontal diseases, are known to occur together in plaque samples that are adjacent to the epithelial lining of the periodontal pocket in deeper areas.

Strongly associated with the clinical progression of chronic periodontitis.

All red complex members were routinely found together in subgingival plaque, often adjacent to the epithelial lining of the periodontal pocket of the gingival sulcus, while commonly suggested that T. forsythia colonizes plaque before P.gingivalis and T. denticola, due to

1. T.forsythia is more prevalent than P.gingivalis in subgingival plaque
2. P. gingivalis or T. denticola were rarely found in subgingival plaque without T. forsythia.

The red complex appears later during biofilm development, and presents at sites of progressing periodontitis. They are rarely found in the absence of members of orange complex. With increasing colonization by the orange complex, more sites were colonized by increasing numbers of the red complex.

They exhibit a very strong relationship with pocket depth and bleeding on probing. Red complex increased in prevalence and numbers with increasing pocket depth

In moderate pockets (4mm-6mm): T. denticola detected at the surface layer of the plaque, which is the outer plaque that is closer to gingival crevice. It is highly motile, moves easily through soft tissue and biofilm, in order to help "open pathways" for other bacteria.

P. gingivalis cells detected in the layer beneath, which is closer to the tooth surface. It produces virulence factors and disrupts host immune response.

In deep pockets (>6mm): The environment is anaerobic, nutrient-rich (due to gingival crevicular fluid, tissue breakdown products) and harder for host defense to reach. Thus, all red complex species coexisted in large numbers, explaining rapid progression of periodontitis and the higher difficulty of treatment.

Members of Red Complexes:

1. Porphyromonas gingivalis
2. Tannerella forsythia (previous names Bacteroides forsythus, or Tannerella forsynthensis)
3. Treponema denticola

=== Porphyromonas gingivalis ===
P. gingivalis

- Involved in: periodontal disease progression, bone and tissue destruction
- Specific co-aggregation achieved by interactions between P. gingivalis and other members of oral microbiota (Streptococcus spp., F. nucleatum), in order to effectively colonize the subgingival sulcus
- Initial event of pathogenicity: adherence (interaction) in oral cavity, by employing several bacterial components: fimbriae, proteases, hemagglutinins, lipopolysaccharide
- Gram-negative, non-motile, asacchrolytic.

Virulence factors

Capsule	Increase resistance to phagocytosis, serum resistance, decreased chemotaxis of PMN's
Bacterial fimbriae	Can be catogorised into two types: 1. Type-specific fimbriae = involved in adhesions (interaction with other bacteria and mammalian cells), produce and delivers selected toxins, motility 2. Sex pili = involved in bacterial conjugation
Outer membrane proteins	Contains about 20 major proteins, variates in size.; Fibroblast-stimulating ability (stimulates thymidine incorporated human gingival fibroblast)
Proteinases	P. gingivalis produce large number of hydrolytic, proteolytic, lipolytic enzymes. Important P.gingivalis associated proteases are: trypsin, thiol, caseinolytic proteinases, peptidases

=== Treponema denticola ===
T. denticola

- Accidentally discovered due to the patience receiving metronidazole for Trichomonal Vaginitis reduced signs and symptoms of ANUG.
- A type of spirochetes. Spirochetes increase inflammation, dental plaque, gingival exudate, bleeding on probing, periodontal pocket depth, and the loss of connective tissue attachment.
- Co-aggregation through interaction with other oral bacterial species, notably P. gingivalis and F. nucleatum

Virulence factors:

- Mainly produces hydrolytic enzymes like:
  - Hyalouronidase
  - Collagenase
  - Protease
  - Phospholipase
  - Phosphatases
- Others are -
  - Major outer sheath protein (MsP)
  - OppA (ortholog)
  - FH-like binding protein
  - Dentilism
  - Leucine-rich repeat A

=== Tannerella forsythia ===
- An anaerobic gram-negative member of Cytophaga-Bacteroides family.
- previous names Bacteroides forsythus, or Tannerella forsynthensis)
- Stronger association with various forms of periodontal disease, including gingivitis, chronic and aggressive periodontitis, than with healthy gingival
- T. forsythia infection is more likely to cause periodontitis in overweight women than in normal-weight woman.
- Subjecting overweight or obese individuals to higher risk of developing periodontal disease due to the overgrowth of T. forsythia.

Virulence factors (only few is identified)

- Trypsin-like and PrtH proteases
- Sialidases SiaH and NanH
- Leucine-rich repeat (Lrr) cell surface-associated and secreted protein BspA
- α-D-glucosidase
- N-acetyl-b-glucosaminidase Hemagglutinin

== 3.2 Orange Complex Bacteria ==
Orange Complex Bacteria bridges organisms in plaque maturation & play a role in biofilm development.

They are notable for their strong ability to adhere to a wide range of other oral bacteria. These bacteria act as a "bridging" species in biofilm development, connecting early commensal colonies with later, more pathogenic bacteria associated with periodontal disease. Their presence is crucial as they will facilitate the establishment and survival of the highly pathogenic red complex [9]. The orange complex is essential for the red complex to dominate the biofilm as periodontal disease advances. The periodontal pocket provides a favourable environment for anaerobic, motile bacteria, such as red and orange complex bacteria, to thrive. Orange complex pathogens, particularly Fusobacterium, Prevotella, and Campylobacter species are often implicated in the development and progression of periodontitis.

=== Fusobacterium nucleatum ===
- Bridging colonizer
  - Connect early Gram-positive colonizers with late Gram-negative pathogens
- Biofilm ecology
  - Facilitate interactions between Gram-positive and Gram negative species and contribute to establishing anaerobic conditions necessary for the survival of oxygen-intolerant species
- Association with periodontitis
  - Increased in number at site of periodontitis
  - Doesn't directly cause tissue destruction

=== Prevotella intermedia ===
- Promote biofilm development
  - Interacts with other bacteria via cell-cell recognition, thus undergoing metabolite exchange
- Enhances bacterial virulence of surrounding bacteria
- Contributes to infection & inflammation
  - E.g.: Interacts with Peptostreptococcus species, thus enhancing the virulence of the microbial, contributing to dentoalveolar infections

=== Campylobacter rectus ===
- Associated with diseased periodontal sites
- More prevalent and abundant in initial and established periodontitis
- Linked to diseased progression
- Shows strong association with red complex bacteria

== 3.3 Other Important Periodontal Pathogens ==
While Sigmund Socransky's complexes explain biofilm progression well, several clinically significant pathogens are not strictly grouped within these complexes. These organisms are especially important in aggressive periodontitis and specific disease patterns.

=== Aggregatibacter actinomycetemcomitans ===
Aggregatibacter actinomycetemcomitans is a Gram-negative bacterium that is part of the oral microbiota. The aggregative nature of this pathogen or pathobiont is crucial to its involvement in human disease. It has been cultured from non-oral infections for more than a century, while its portrayal as an aetiological agent in periodontitis has emerged more recently.

Role in disease:

- Strongly associated with Aggressive Periodontitis (main pathogen) and Molar-Incisor pattern periodontitis
- Can invade gingival tissues directly (not just surface biofilm)

Virulence Factors

- Leukotoxin (LtxA) - kills neutrophils which weakens host defense
- Cytolethal distending toxin (CDT) - disrupts cell cycle
- Endotoxin (LPS) inflammation
- Ability to invade epithelial cells

=== Eikenella corrodens ===
a facultative Gram-negative bacillus which is a common inhabitant of the oral cavity and the intestinal and genital tracts. Its primary ecologic niche within the oral cavity appears to be dental plaque, both in periodontally healthy individuals and in periodontitis patients. However, E. corrodens is recognized as an infrequent human pathogen capable of causing extraoral infections, either as the sole infectious agent or as part of a mixed infection. It has a potential role in the etiology of periodontal disease as E. corrodens is often present in the supra- and subgingival plaque of periodontally healthy subjects.

Role in disease

- Linked to aggressive periodontitis and immunocompromised patients
- It contributes to tissue inflammation and periodontal attachment loss
- It is also often found alongside A.actinomycetemocomitans which suggest synergistic effects in aggressive periodontitis

=== Capnocytophaga spp. ===
Capnocytophaga species are commonly found in human oral microbiome. Capnocytophaga species such as C. ochracea and C. sputigena are classified as 'green complex' bacteria and are involved in early colonization of the dental biofilm. Capnocytophaga species are primarily found in the subgingival plaque of patients with periodontitis. Furthermore, Capnocytophaga species are abundantly found in oral squamous cell carcinoma tissue, suggesting that Capnocytophaga may contribute to the development of oral cancer as well as the pathology of periodontitis

Role in disease:

- Frequently found alongside Aggregatibacter Actinomycetemcomitans
- Contributes to rapid attachment lost
- Releases host factors that promote gingival inflammation and connective tissue breakdown
- More prominent in immunocompromised patients or those with poor host defence

Indicates:

- disease susceptibility
- Host related risk factors
- Cases where disease severity seems disproportionate to plaque levels

=== Aggressive periodontitis association with periodontal pathogens ===
Unlike chronic periodontitis (which follows biofilm maturation like red/orange complexes), aggressive periodontitis involves:

- Highly virulent bacteria
  - Key Pathogens:
    - Primary: Aggregatibacter actinomycetemcomitans
    - Secondary: Capnocytophaga spp. (occasionally eikenella corrodens)
- Host susceptibility
  - Impaired neutrophil function is a common finding
- Not purely biofilm dependent
  - Disease progression does not require mature plaque (red complex)

== IV. Virulence factors of periodontal pathogens ==
Periodontal diseases are driven by a dysbiotic subgingival biofilm in which keystone pathogens, such as Porphyromonas gingivalis, Tannerella forsythia, and Aggregatibacter actinomycetemcomitans, employ a diverse array of virulence factors to colonize the host, destroy tissues, and subvert immune defences.

=== 4.1 Adhesins and colonisation ===
Adhesins are surface-associated components that mediate bacterial attachment to host tissues. In Porphyromonas gingivalis, these adhesins are primarily associated with fimbriae, which are filamentous structures composed of repeating protein subunits. Fimbriae function as key mediators of adhesion to host cells and are essential for interactions between the bacterium and the host.

Fimbriae contribute to the colonization of host tissues by facilitating bacterial attachment. They are also involved in biofilm formation and may participate in the invasion of host cells. These properties support the ability of periodontal pathogens to establish and persist within the host environment.

=== 4.2 Enzymes ===
Periodontal pathogens secrete enzymes that contribute significantly to tissue destruction and disease progression. These enzymes can be broadly categorized into host-derived collagenases (matrix metalloproteinases) and bacterial proteases.

==== Collagenases ====
Matrix metalloproteinases (MMPs) are enzymes produced by human cells that break down collagen and other extracellular matrix proteins. In periodontal diseases, levels of MMPs are elevated in gum tissues and gingival crevicular fluid, reflecting ongoing tissue destruction. Although bacteria are present in periodontitis, the main collagen-degrading activity is host-derived. MMP-8, the predominant collagenase in disease, is secreted by immune cells such as neutrophils and by gingival fibroblasts and epithelial cells. Overactive MMPs contribute to the breakdown of connective tissue and alveolar bone, which can result in tooth loss if untreated.

==== Proteases ====
Gingipains are cysteine proteases produced by Porphyromonas gingivalis, a major contributor to periodontal disease. They are classified as arginine‑specific (Rgp) and lysine‑specific (Kgp) proteases, encoded by the rgpA/rgpB and kgp genes, respectively. Both RgpA and Kgp are synthesized as large precursor proteins that include adhesive regions, which remain attached to the active enzyme and help the bacterium bind to connective tissue components such as fibrinogen and fibronectin. Gingipains also contribute directly to tissue destruction by activating the host's own matrix metalloproteinases and by degrading structural proteins like collagen. In addition, they interfere with the immune response by inactivating key complement proteins, thereby hindering the body's ability to fight infection.

=== 4.3 Toxins ===
Toxins produced by periodontal pathogens play a key role in tissue destruction, inflammation, and disease progression.

- Leukotoxins: These specifically target host immune cells, particularly neutrophils and macrophages. By lysing these cells, leukotoxins impair the host's primary defence, allowing bacteria to survive and proliferate within periodontal tissues.
- Endotoxins (LPS): Lipopolysaccharides from Gram-negative bacteria (e.g. Porphyromonas gingivalis) stimulate a strong host inflammatory response. They activate immune cells to release cytokines such as IL-1 and TNF-α, which promote connective tissue breakdown and alveolar bone resorption.

=== 4.4 Immune modulation ===
Periodontal pathogens can manipulate the host immune system to enhance their persistence and chronic infection.

- Immune evasion: Bacteria can alter their surface antigens, invade host cells, or inhibit immune signalling pathways, allowing them to avoid recognition and destruction by the host immune system.
- Complement manipulation: Certain pathogens (e.g. Porphyromonas gingivalis) interfere with the complement cascade (e.g. C3, C5a pathways), reducing opsonization and phagocytosis. This dysregulation can also lead to excessive inflammation that benefits bacterial survival while damaging host tissues.

== V. Links Between Periodontal Disease and Systemic Health ==
Periodontal disease is a chronic inflammatory condition affecting the supporting structures of the teeth, initiated by pathogenic bacterial biofilms and sustained by an exaggerated host immune response. Traditionally considered a localized oral disease, it is now widely recognized to have systemic implications.

A growing body of evidence has demonstrated associations between periodontal disease and systemic conditions such as Cardiovascular disease, Diabetes mellitus, Rheumatoid arthritis, and Alzheimer's disease

Associations with systemic diseases:

=== 5.1 Cardiovascular Disease ===
A strong association exists between periodontal disease and cardiovascular disease, including coronary artery disease and stroke.

Mechanisms

- pathogens have been detected in atherosclerotic plaques
- Systemic inflammation increases levels of C-reactive protein (CRP) and other mediators involved in plaque formation
- Endothelial dysfunction promotes vascular injury

Epidemiological studies indicate that individuals with periodontitis have an increased risk of cardiovascular events, although a direct causal relationship has not been definitively established.

=== 5.2 Diabetes Mellitus ===
The relationship between periodontal disease and diabetes mellitus is bidirectional, meaning each condition influences the other.

Mechanisms

- Hyperglycaemia impairs immune function, increasing susceptibility to infection
- Advanced glycation end products (AGEs) enhance inflammatory responses
- Periodontal inflammation contributes to insulin resistance

Clinically, patients with diabetes often experience more severe periodontal disease. Conversely, periodontal therapy has been shown to produce modest improvements in glycaemic control.

=== 5.3 Rheumatoid Arthritis ===
Periodontal disease has been associated with rheumatoid arthritis, a chronic autoimmune condition affecting the joints.

Mechanisms

- Porphyromonas gingivalis produces peptidylarginine deiminase (PAD), which induces citrullination of proteins
- Citrullinated proteins trigger the production of anti-citrullinated protein antibodies (ACPAs), a hallmark of rheumatoid arthritis
- Shared inflammatory pathways (e.g., TNF-α, IL-1) contribute to both diseases

These findings suggest that periodontal infection may play a role in initiating or exacerbating autoimmune processes.

=== 5.4 Alzheimer's Disease ===
Emerging research has identified a potential association between periodontal disease and Alzheimer's disease.

Mechanisms

- Periodontal pathogens and their virulence factors (e.g. gingipains) have been detected in brain tissue
- Chronic systemic inflammation may promote neuroinflammation
- Inflammatory pathways may contribute to amyloid-beta deposition and neuronal damage

Although these findings are significant, the causal relationship remains under investigation.

== See also ==
- Red complex
