= Tannerella forsythia =

Scientific classification
- Domain: Bacteria
- Kingdom: Pseudomonadati
- Phylum: Bacteroidota
- Class: Bacteroidia
- Order: Bacteroidales
- Family: Tannerellaceae
- Genus: Tannerella
- Species: T. forsythia

Binomial name
- Tannerella forsythia (Tanner et al. 1986) Sakamoto et al. 2002

Species of bacterium

Tannerella forsythia is an anaerobic, Gram-negative bacterial species of the Bacteroidota phylum. It has been implicated in periodontal diseases and is a member of the red complex of periodontal pathogens. T. forsythia was previously named Bacteroides forsythus and Tannerella forsythensis.

Tannerella forsythia was discovered by and named after Anne Tanner, who works at The Forsyth Institute located in Cambridge, Massachusetts.

Tannerella forsythia has been identified in atherosclerotic lesions. Lee et al. found that infecting mice with T. forsythia induced foam cell formation and accelerated the formation of atherosclerotic lesions. It has also been isolated from women with bacterial vaginosis. The presence of oral T. forsythia has been found to be associated with an increased risk of esophageal cancer.

== See also ==
- List of bacterial vaginosis microbiota
