= Open flap debridement =

Dental procedure

In dentistry, open flap debridement is a periodontal procedure in which the supporting alveolar bone and root surfaces of teeth are exposed by incising the gingiva to provide increased access for scaling and root planing. While the efficacy of this treatment is debated, it is almost always performed ancillary to any osseous resective or regenerative periodontal procedures.

== Purpose ==
Open flap debridement is one of the surgical approaches to obtain access to the root surface to remove all the irritants. The purposes of periodontal surgery in managing periodontal disease are:

- To control or eliminate periodontal disease.
- To correct anatomic conditions that favor periodontal disease.
- To place implants for replacing lost teeth and improving the environment for their placement and function.

For example, furcation involvement due to periodontal disease can limit the access for non-surgical scaling and subgingival root instrumentation in these areas, and hence these problems can be rectified by resecting or displacing the soft tissue wall of the pocket, which increases the visibility and accessibility of the root surface. Other than that, it is also helpful to reduce or eliminate residual pocket depth after non-surgical therapy to improve the long-term prognosis and ease the maintenance of patients. Many moderate to advanced periodontitis cases cannot be resolved without surgical access to the root surface for instrumentation. Plaque accumulation will cause gingival inflammation and eventually lead to pocket deepening. A pocket makes it impossible for the patient to remove biofilm and makes this a vicious cycle. Hence, open flap debridement can be performed to help reduce the pocket depth.

These are the other purposes or indications of open flap debridement:

- As monotherapy for suprabony pockets: residual pocketing without an underlying bone defect, surgery accesses root surfaces for calculus and dental biofilm removal
- As monotherapy for infrabony pockets associated with shallow bone defects in the anterior maxilla
- As part of regenerative therapy to provide surgical access to bone defects

== Indications ==
Indications for open flap debridement are as following:

1. Deep periodontal pockets: It is often correlating with more advanced periodontal disease, necessitate a surgical approach. The depth of these pockets can complicate non-surgical therapies, and OFD allows for direct visualisation and access to root surfaces for comprehensive cleaning, aiding in inflammation reduction and allowing effective placement of regenerative materials if necessary. Such access is crucial in cases with persistent inflammation that do not respond to traditional therapies.

2. Grade II or III furcation involvement: In these situations, where interradicular bone loss complicates hygiene maintenance, open flap debridement becomes essential. The literature emphasizes that the challenge posed by furcation defects—especially their propensity for residual calculus even after surgical intervention—mandates the use of OFD to facilitate thorough cleaning and subsequent therapeutic measures. In addition, studies have indicated that OFD can mitigate further attachment loss when combined with regenerative techniques.

3. Intrabony pockets/defects: It is an indicative of advanced gum disease, represent another scenario where OFD is indicated. The surgical exposure granted by OFD permits the correct assessment and treatment of intrabony defects, which, when enhanced by following surgical debridement with regenerative procedures, often leads to significant clinical improvements.

4. Irregular bony contours: This is observed in advanced gum disease complicates healing and regeneration efforts, underscoring the necessity of thoroughly assessing these areas through surgical exposure.

Additionally, references highlight that while approaches such as grafting and guided tissue regeneration (GTR) can augment results post-OFD, it is crucial that these adjunctive therapies occur after proper debridement to ensure optimal outcomes. When performed effectively, OFD can promote substantial gains in clinical attachment levels and pocket reduction, particularly when combined with biomaterials that facilitate healing and regeneration.

== Postoperative care of open flap debridement ==
Proper postoperative care is essential to ensure optimal healing, reduce complications, and maintain the long-term success of the treatment. Below is a detailed guide to postoperative care based on clinical studies and expert recommendations.

- 1. Pain management
- Postoperative Discomfort: Mild to moderate pain is common after open flap debridement. Pain levels can vary depending on the surgical technique used, for example conventional or microsurgical. Studies suggest that microsurgical techniques result in less postoperative pain due to precise tissue handling and smaller incisions.
- Medications:
- Nonsteroidal anti-inflammatory drugs (NSAIDs), such as ibuprofen, are commonly prescribed to manage pain and inflammation.
- In some cases, acetaminophen or stronger analgesics may be recommended for severe discomfort.
- Antibiotics like amoxicillin (500 mg thrice daily for 5 days) are often prescribed to prevent infection.
- Patient monitoring: Patients are advised to track the number of analgesics taken during the first week post-surgery and report this during follow-up appointments.
- 2. Wound care
- Periodontal dressing: A non-eugenol periodontal dressing, such as Coe-Pak®, is typically applied to protect the surgical site and promote healing.
- Suture care: Sutures are usually removed within 7–10 days post-surgery. Microsurgical techniques often use finer sutures for example 5-0 sutures, which may enhance wound healing compared to conventional sutures 3-0 .
- Avoid trauma: Patients should avoid touching or manipulating the surgical site with their tongue or fingers to prevent wound disruption.
- 3. Oral hygiene
- Chlorhexidine rinse: A 0.2% chlorhexidine gluconate mouthwash is recommended twice daily for 2–4 weeks post-surgery to control bacterial growth and promote healing.
- Brushing and flossing:
- Avoid brushing or flossing near the surgical site for at least one week.
- Resume gentle brushing with a soft-bristled toothbrush once advised by the dentist or periodontist.
- Plaque control: Maintaining low plaque levels is critical for successful healing. Studies show that poor plaque control can negatively impact soft tissue attachment and bone regeneration.
- 4. Diet and lifestyle
- Dietary modifications:
- A soft diet is recommended during the initial healing phase (first week) to minimize trauma to the surgical site.
- Avoid hot, spicy, or hard foods that could irritate or damage the area.
- Hydration: Drink plenty of water but avoid using straws, as suction can disrupt clot formation.
- Lifestyle adjustments:
- Smoking cessation is strongly advised, as smoking can delay wound healing and increase the risk of complications like infection or tissue necrosis.
- Limit strenuous physical activities during the first few days post-surgery.
- 5. Follow-up appointments
- Suture removal: Sutures are typically removed at a follow-up visit scheduled within 7–10 days after surgery.
- Healing assessment:
- Early healing is evaluated using indices such as the Landry Healing Index. Studies indicate that microsurgical techniques achieve better early healing scores compared to conventional methods.
- Long-term assessments focus on probing pocket depth reduction, clinical attachment level improvement, and gingival health.
- Maintenance visits: Regular professional cleanings every three months are recommended to maintain periodontal health and prevent disease recurrence.
- 6. Potential complications
- While complications are rare with proper postoperative care, patients should be aware of possible issues:
- Infection: Signs include increased pain, swelling, redness, or discharge from the surgical site. Prompt medical attention is required.
- Gingival recession: Some degree of gingival recession may occur as part of the healing process, particularly in areas with deep pockets before surgery.
- Delayed healing: Factors such as poor oral hygiene, smoking, or systemic conditions (e.g., diabetes) can slow down recovery.
- Clinical evidence supporting postoperative care
- A randomized controlled trial comparing conventional and microsurgical open flap debridement found that microsurgery significantly improved early healing outcomes and reduced postoperative pain due to precise tissue handling.
- Another study demonstrated that regular maintenance visits and effective plaque control positively correlate with better soft tissue attachment gain and bone regeneration after surgery.

== Benefits ==
Open flap surgery offers numerous advantages in preserving and enhancing oral health. Several key benefits of open flap debridement include the following:

Thorough plaque and tartar elimination: Open flap surgery enables deep cleaning beneath the gum line, effectively removing plaque and tartar to target the underlying cause of periodontal disease.

Enhanced oal hygiene: Open flap surgery removes the source of infection, making it easier and more effective to maintain proper oral care.

Decreased gum inflammation: The procedure effectively alleviates gum swelling, relieving discomfort and promoting better overall gum health.

Tooth loss prevention: Open flap surgery helps protect against tooth loss caused by advanced gum disease. By treating the condition early, the procedure preserves your natural teeth.

Bone restoration: When periodontal disease leads to bone loss, open flap surgery can incorporate bone grafting to encourage regeneration, promoting long-term gum health and dental stability.

Strong Foundation for a lasting smile: Open flap surgery supports lifelong gum health and a confident smile, acting as a proactive measure for maintaining both oral and overall well-being.
