= Periodontal probe =

Dental instrument for measuring depths of gum pockets around a tooth

In dentistry, a periodontal probe is a dental instrument which is usually long, thin, and blunted at the end. Its main function is to evaluate the depth of the pockets surrounding a tooth in order to determine the periodontium's overall health. For accuracy and readability, the instrument's head has markings written on it.

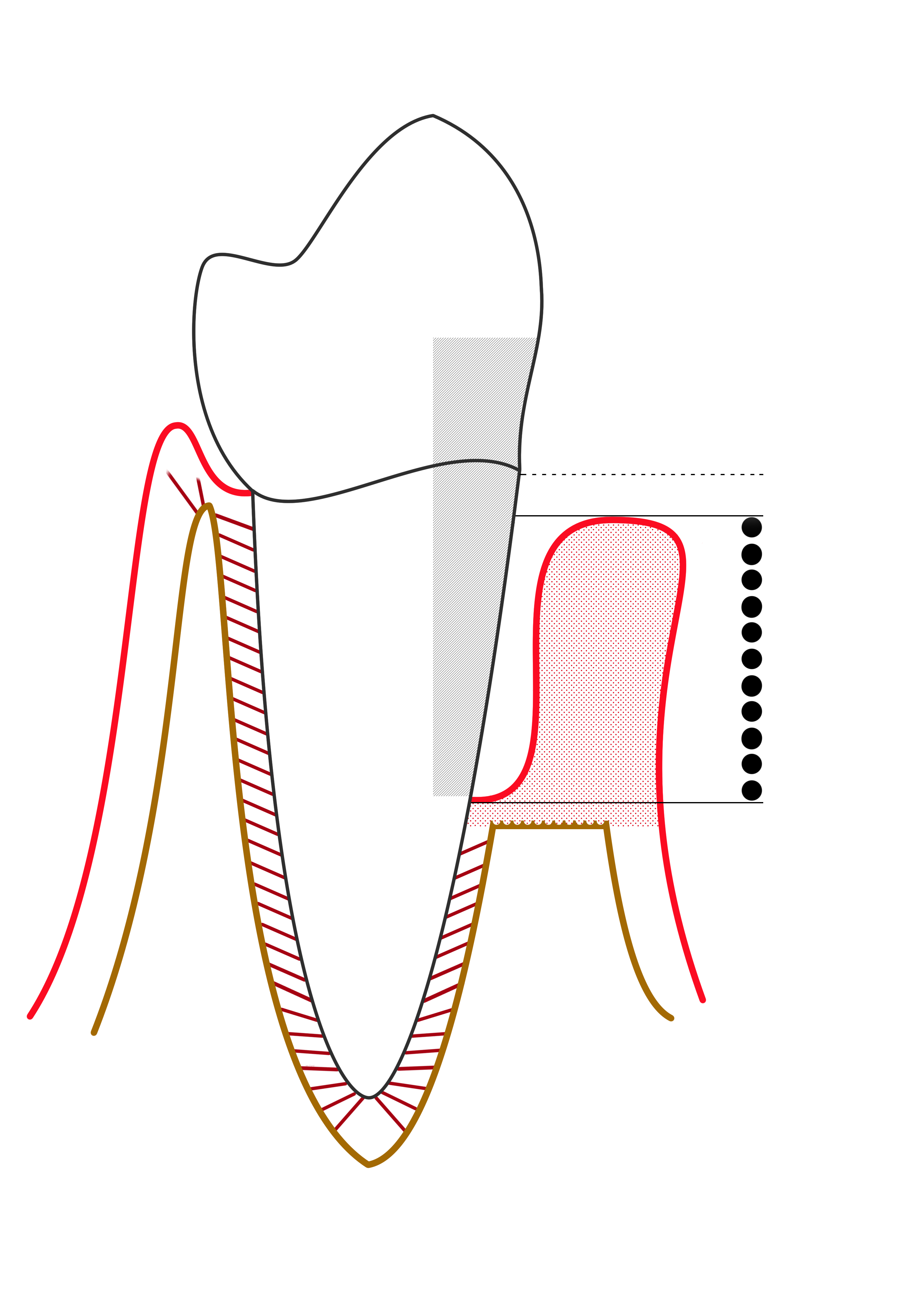
Periodontal pocket depth measured by a periodontal probe

== Use ==
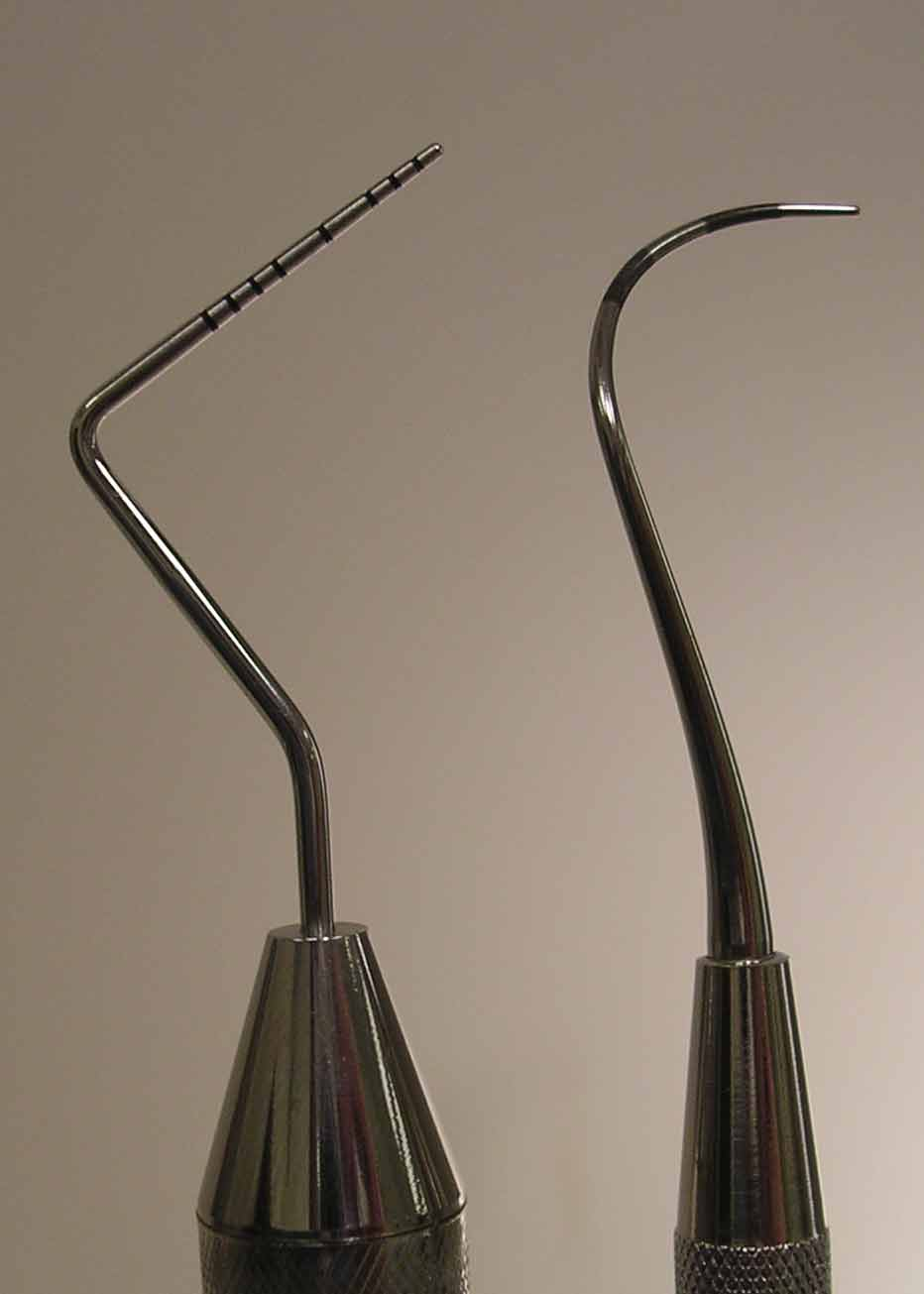
Michigan O probe with Williams markings (left) and Naber's probe with shades alternating every 3 mm (right).

Proper use of the periodontal probe is necessary to maintain accuracy. The tip of the instrument is placed with light pressure of 10-20 grams into the gingival sulcus, which is an area of potential space between a tooth and the surrounding tissue. It is important to keep the periodontal probe parallel to the contours of the root of the tooth and to insert the probe down to the base of the pocket. This results in obscuring a section of the periodontal probe's tip. The first marking visible above the pocket indicates the measurement of the pocket depth. It has been found that the average, healthy pocket depth is around 3 mm with no bleeding upon probing. Depths greater than 3 mm can be associated with "attachment loss" of the tooth to the surrounding alveolar bone, which is a characteristic found in periodontitis. Pocket depths greater than 3 mm can also be a sign of gingival hyperplasia.

The periodontal probe can also be used to measure other dental instruments, tooth preparations during restorative procedures, gingival recession, attached gingiva, and oral lesions or pathologies. Bleeding on probing (BoP), even with a gentle touch, can also occur in this situation. It is due to the periodontal probe damaging the increased blood vessels in the capillary plexus of the lamina propria, which are now closer to the surface because of the ulceration of the junctional epithelium (JE). The presence of bleeding is one of the first clinical signs of active periodontal disease in uncomplicated cases and should be recorded per individual tooth and tooth surface in the patient record. However, in patients with chronic nicotine use such as cigarette and patches, the gingival tissue rarely bleeds because of factors that are not related to dental biofilm and calculus formation even with gingivitis. Instead it is due to the incorporated nicotine causing vasoconstriction, a narrowing of the blood vessels cutting off blood flow.

There are many different types of periodontal probes, and each has its own manner of indicating measurements on the tip of the instrument. For example, the Michigan O probe has markings at 3 mm, 6 mm and 8 mm and the Williams probe has circumferential lines at 1 mm, 2 mm, 3 mm, 5 mm, 7 mm, 8 mm, 9 mm, and 10 mm. The PCP12 probe with Marquis markings has alternating shades every 3 mm. Unlike the previous two mentioned, the Naber's probe is curved and is used for measuring into the furcation area between the roots of a tooth.

PCP12 probe with shades alternating every 3 mm. The probe is on a modified Novatech shank, intended to make it easier to align the probe with the vertical axis of the teeth.

With the information obtained from probing, visual assessment and radiography, the specialist can already determine the stage and classify the patient's periodontal disease. Gums in an unhealthy state contribute to tooth loss and other adverse effects. Additional concerns include adverse health effects such as diabetes, cardiovascular complications, or premature births.

In 1958, periodontist Orban described the periodontal probe as "the clinician's eye under the gingival margin" and its use as a basic element of a complete examination in periodontics.

=== Electronic probes ===
This type of probe is associated with the use of a computer and electronic data storage. The diagnosis may also record data on pocket depth, recession, missing teeth, furcation defects, tooth mobility and the presence of dental deposits.

=== Other functions ===
In addition to measuring the depth of the pardontal pocket, the probe can be used for other purposes:

- Measurement of clinical loss of attachment
- Measurement of gingival margin recession
- Measurement of the width of the attached gingiva
- Measurement of the size of lesion elements in the oral cavity
- Evaluation of bleeding on probing
- Determination of mucogingival ratios
- Monitoring of periodontal tissue changes during treatment

== Additional references ==
- Summit, James B., J. William Robbins, and Richard S. Schwartz. "Fundamentals of Operative Dentistry: A Contemporary Approach." 2nd edition. Carol Stream, Illinois, Quintessence Publishing Co, Inc, 2001. ISBN 0-86715-382-2.
- Wilkins, Esther M. "Clinical Practice of the Dental Hygienist." 8th edition. Lippincott Williams & Wilkins, 1999. ISBN 0-683-30362-7.
- Hefti AF. Periodontal probing. Crit Rev Oral Biol Med. 1997;8(3):336-56. doi: 10.1177/10454411970080030601. PMID 9260047.
- Ramachandra SS, Mehta DS, Sandesh N, Baliga V, Amarnath J. Periodontal probing systems: a review of available equipment. Compend Contin Educ Dent. 2011 Mar;32(2):71-7. PMID 21473303.
