= Impaired fasting glucose =

- Other names: Impaired fasting glycemia, IFG
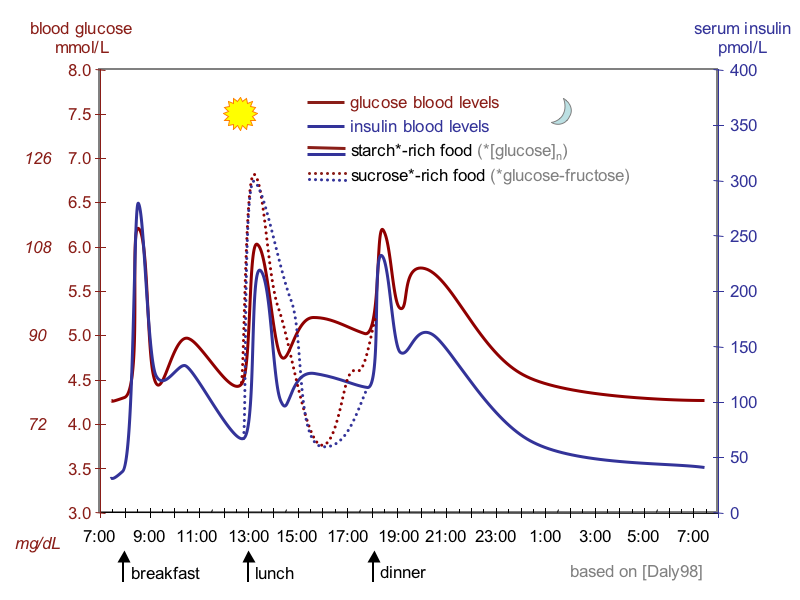
- The fluctuation of blood sugar (red) and the sugar-lowering hormone insulin (blue) in humans during the course of a day with three meals. One of the effects of a sugar-rich vs a starch-rich meal is highlighted.

Impaired fasting glucose is a type of prediabetes, in which a person's blood sugar levels during fasting are consistently above the normal range, but below the diagnostic cut-off for a formal diagnosis of diabetes mellitus. Together with impaired glucose tolerance, it is a sign of insulin resistance. In this manner, it is also one of the conditions associated with metabolic syndrome.

Those with impaired fasting glucose are at an increased risk of vascular complications of diabetes, though to a lesser extent. The risks are cumulative, with both higher blood glucose levels, and the total amount of time it spends elevated, increasing the overall complication rate.

IFG can eventually progress to type 2 diabetes mellitus without intervention, which typically involves lifestyle modification. Those with impaired fasting glucose have a 1.5 fold increased risk of developing clinical diabetes within 10 years, when compared to the general population. Some studies suggest that without lifestyle changes, IFG will progress to clinically diagnosable diabetes in just under 3 years, on average.

Impaired fasting glucose is often, though not always, associated with impaired glucose tolerance, though it may occur in isolation, with such persons having a normal response to a glucose tolerance test.

== Signs and symptoms ==
Impaired fasting glucose is often without any signs or symptoms, other than higher than normal glucose levels being detected in an individual's fasting blood sample. There may be signs and symptoms associated with elevated blood glucose, though these are likely to be minor, with significant symptoms suggestive of complete progression to type 2 diabetes. Such symptoms include:

- Increased thirst
- Increased urination, especially waking up in the night to urinate
- Tiredness and fatigue
- Blurred vision
- Slow healing of wounds
- Altered sensation, such as numbness or tingling, particularly of the hands and feet
- Recurrent, and difficult to clear infections, particularly of the urinary tract

== Risk factors ==
As impaired fasting glucose is considered a precursor condition for type 2 diabetes, it shares the same environmental and genetic risk factors.

== Diagnosis ==
Different organisations use slightly differing levels before classifying a person's fasting blood glucose as "impaired", with the American Diabetes Association using a lower cutoff in its criteria than the World Health Organization. The upper limits remain the same, as fasting levels above this are almost universally accepted as indicative of full diabetes:

- WHO criteria: fasting plasma glucose level from 6.1 mmol/L (110 mg/dL) to 6.9 mmol/L (125 mg/dL).
- ADA criteria: fasting plasma glucose level from 5.6 mmol/L (100 mg/dL) to 6.9 mmol/L (125 mg/dL).

== Prevention ==
The guidelines for preventing impaired fasting glucose are the same as those given for preventing type 2 diabetes in general. If these are adhered to, the progression to clinical diabetes can be slowed or halted. In some cases, a complete reversal of IFG can be achieved. Certain risk factors, such as being of Afro-Caribbean or South Asian ethnicity, as well as increasing age, are unavoidable, and such individuals may be advised to follow these guidelines, as well as monitor their blood glucose levels, more closely.
