= Tooth loosening =

Tooth loosening may refer to:

- Gingival recession, with gradually increased risk of tooth loss
- Tooth loss
