= Blossom =

Flowers of stone fruit trees and of some other plants that flower in spring

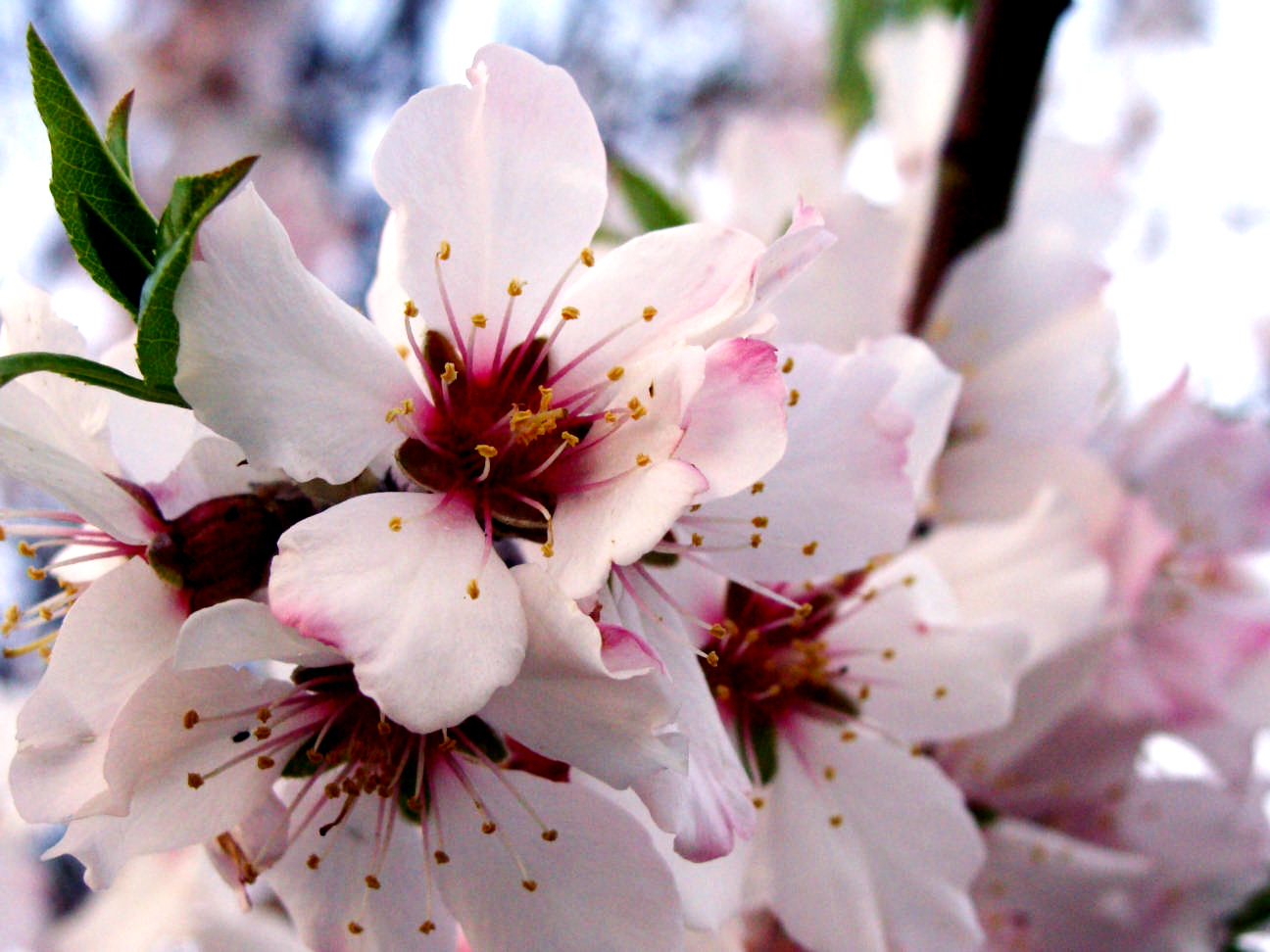
Almond blossom

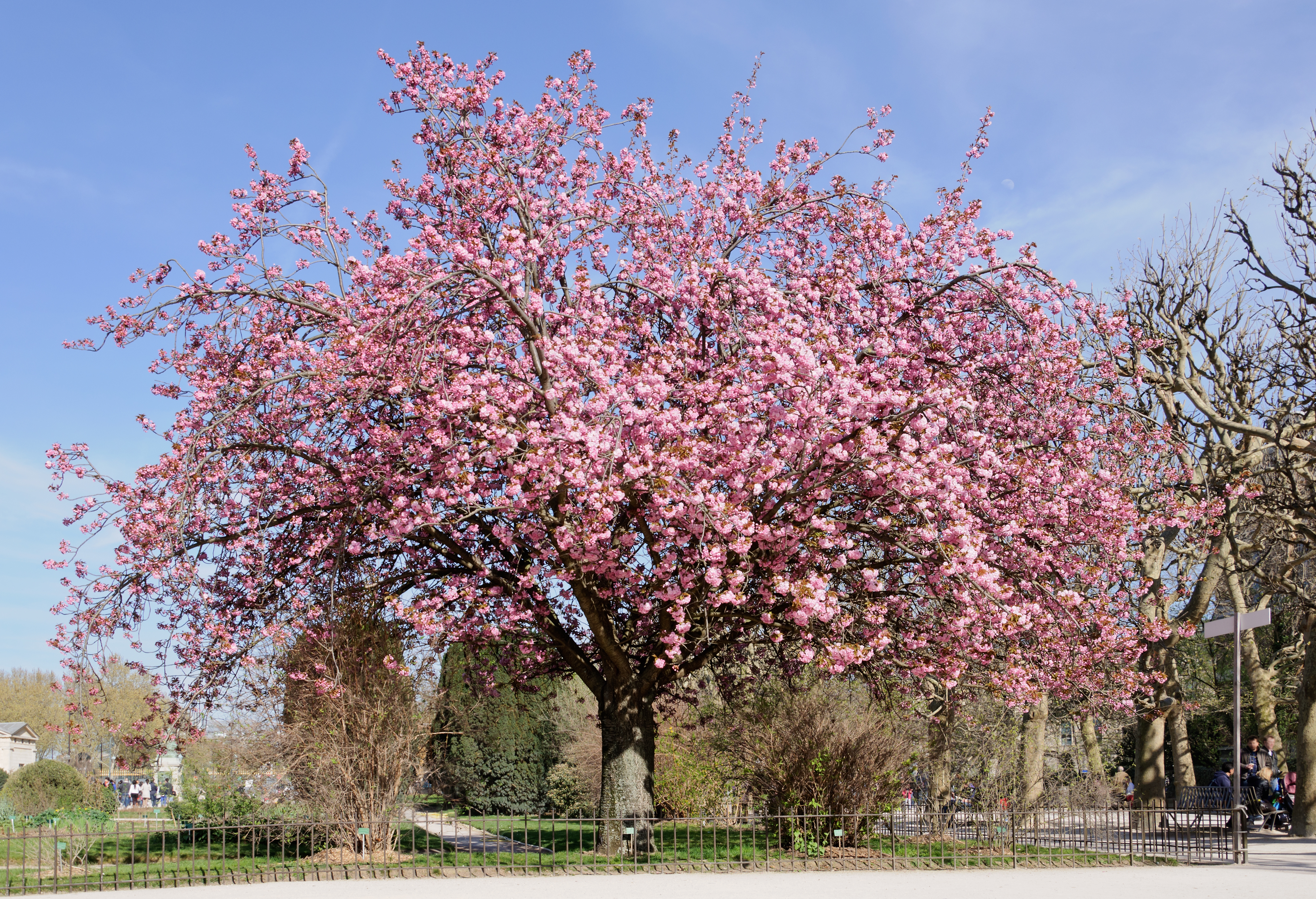
Cherry blossoms, Paris, full bloom

In botany, blossoms are the flowers of stone fruit trees (genus Prunus) and of some other plants with a similar appearance that flower profusely for a period of time in spring.

Colloquially, flowers of orange are referred to as such as well. Peach blossoms (including nectarine), most cherry blossoms, and some almond blossoms are usually pink. Plum blossoms, apple blossoms, orange blossoms, some cherry blossoms, and most almond blossoms are white in colour.

Blossoms provide pollen to pollinators such as bees, and initiate cross-pollination necessary for the trees to reproduce by producing fruit.

== Herbal use ==
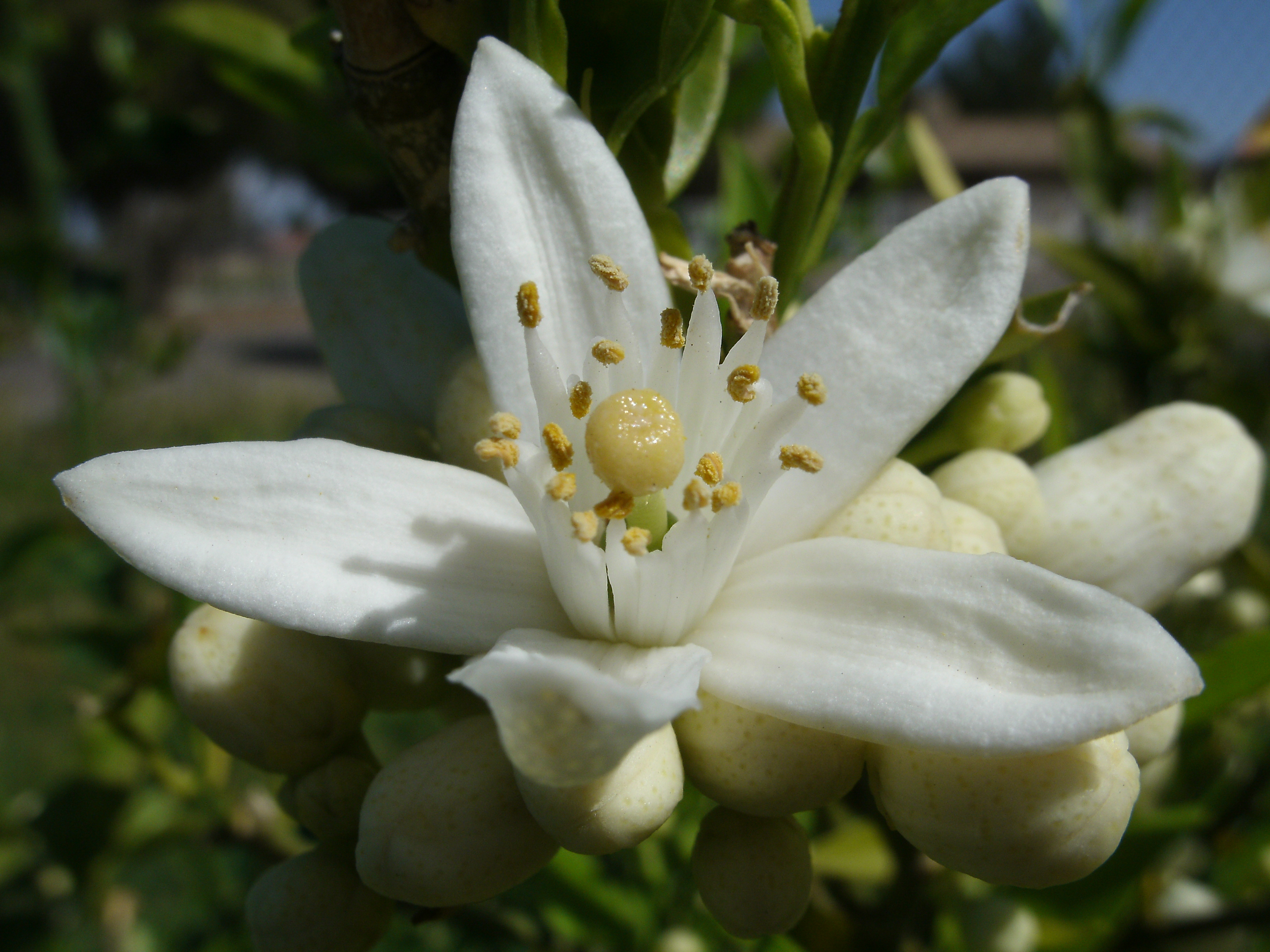
Orange blossom

The ancient Phoenicians used almond blossoms with honey and urine as a tonic, and sprinkled them into stews and gruels to give muscular strength. Crushed petals were also used as a poultice on skin spots and mixed with banana oil, for dry skin and sunburn.

In herbalism the crab apple was used as treatment for boils, abscesses, splinters, wounds, coughs, colds and a host of other ailments ranging from acne to kidney ailments. Many dishes made with apples and apple blossom are of medieval origin. In the spring, monks and physicians would gather the blossoms and preserve them in vinegar for drawing poultices and for bee stings and other insect bites.

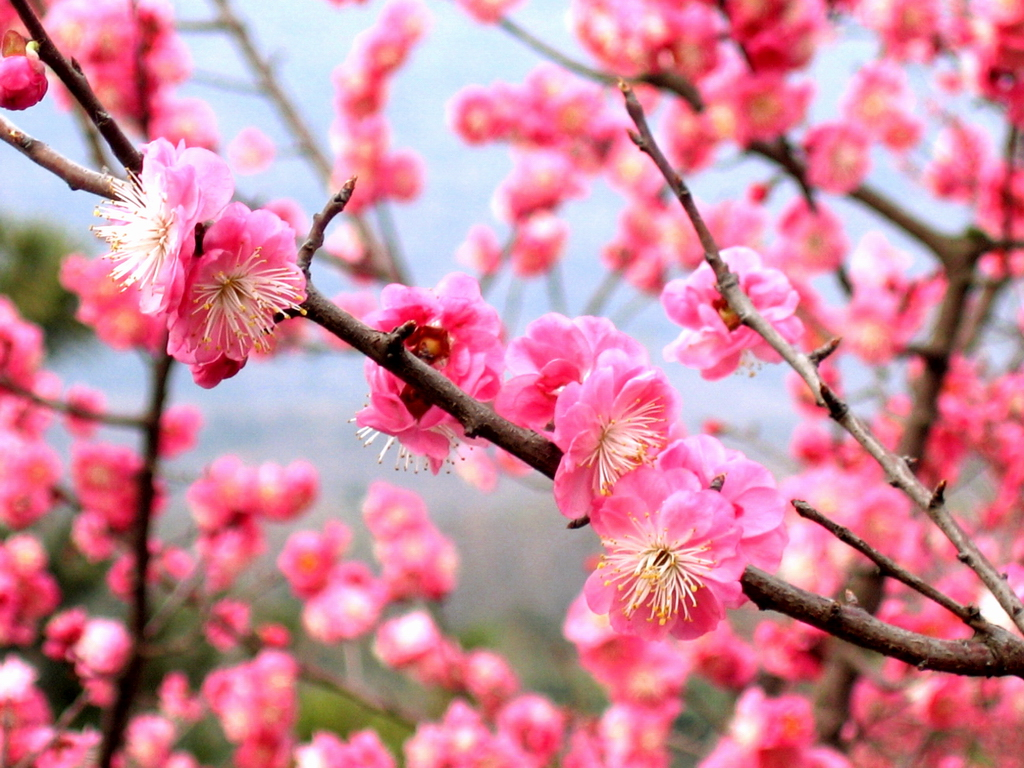
Plum blossom

Descending from China and south east Asia, the earliest orange species moved westwards via the trade routes.

In 17th century Italy peach blossoms were made into a poultice for bruises, rashes, eczema, grazes and stings.

In ancient Greek medicine plum blossoms were used to treat bleeding gums, mouth ulcers and tighten loose teeth. Plum blossoms mixed with sage leaves and flowers were used in plum wine or plum brandy as a mouthwash to soothe sore throats and mouth ailments and sweeten bad breath.

== Blossom festivals ==
Hanami (花見; "flower viewing") is the Japanese traditional custom of enjoying the transient beauty of flowers; in this case, almost always refer to those of the cherry (桜, sakura) or, less frequently, plum (梅, ume) trees.

In England, Wales and Northern Ireland the National Trust organises the environmental awareness campaign #BlossomWatch, which is designed to raise awareness of the first signs of Spring, by encouraging people to share images of blossoms via social media.

== Gallery ==
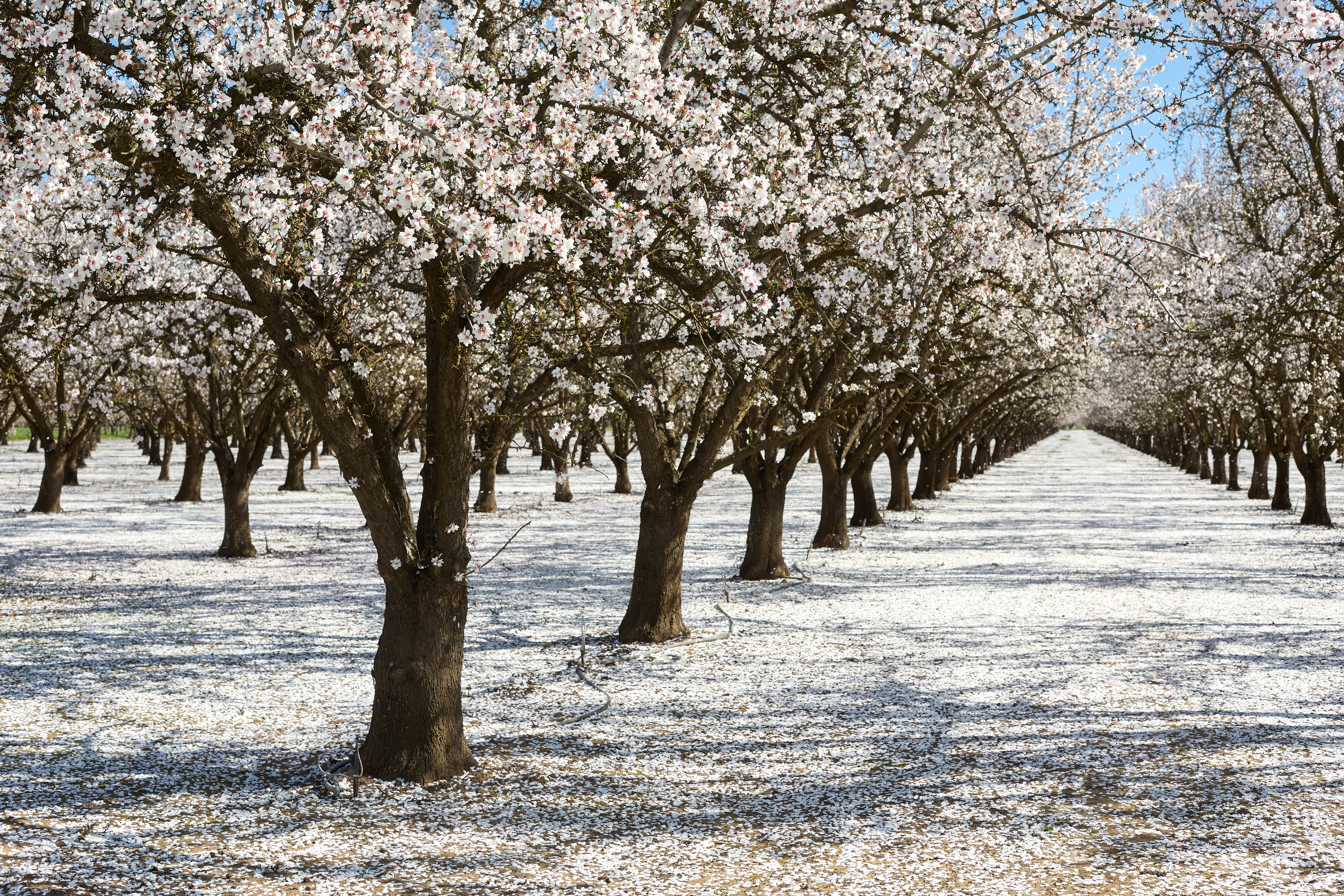
Almond blossoms in Butte County, California

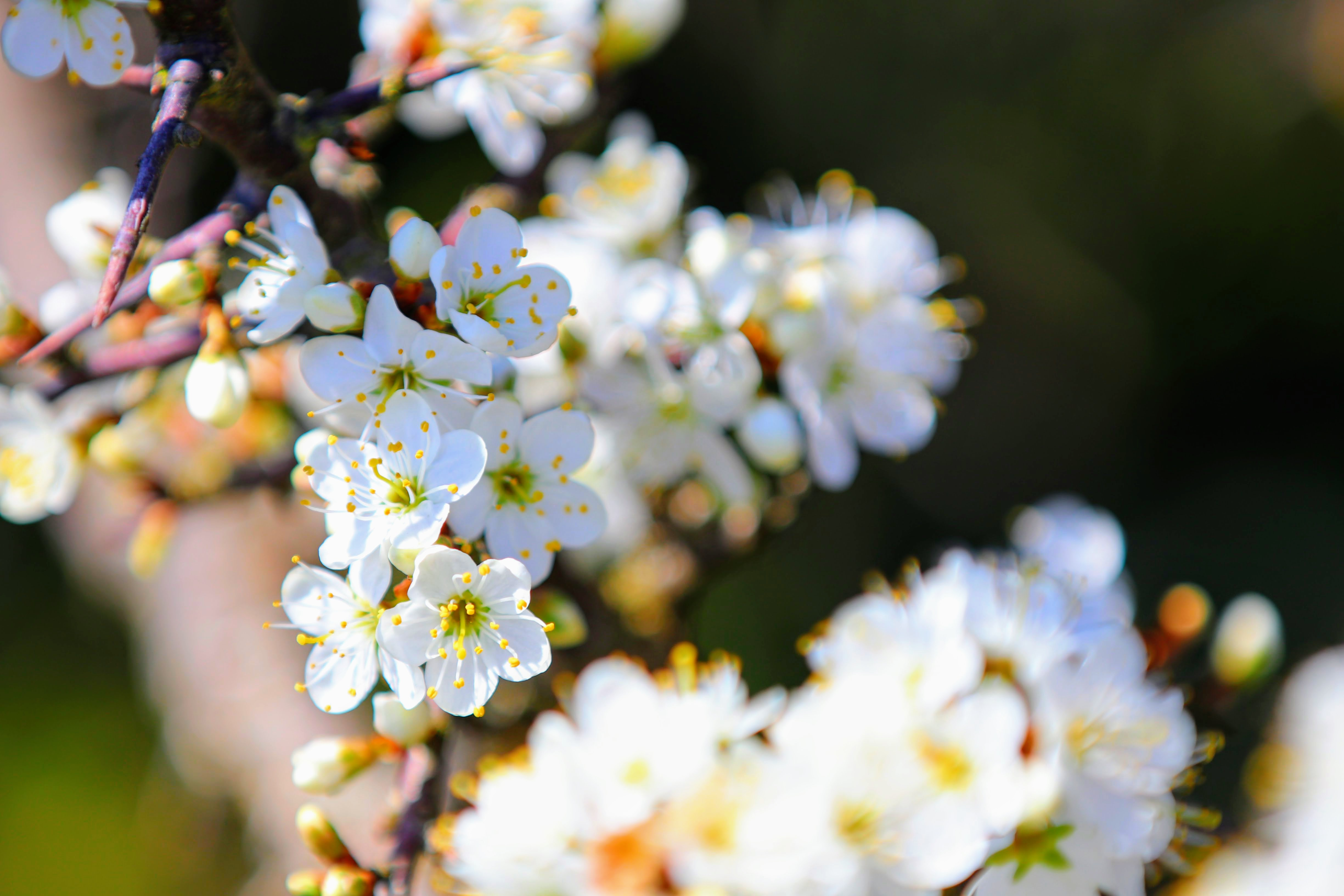
Blackthorn in blossom

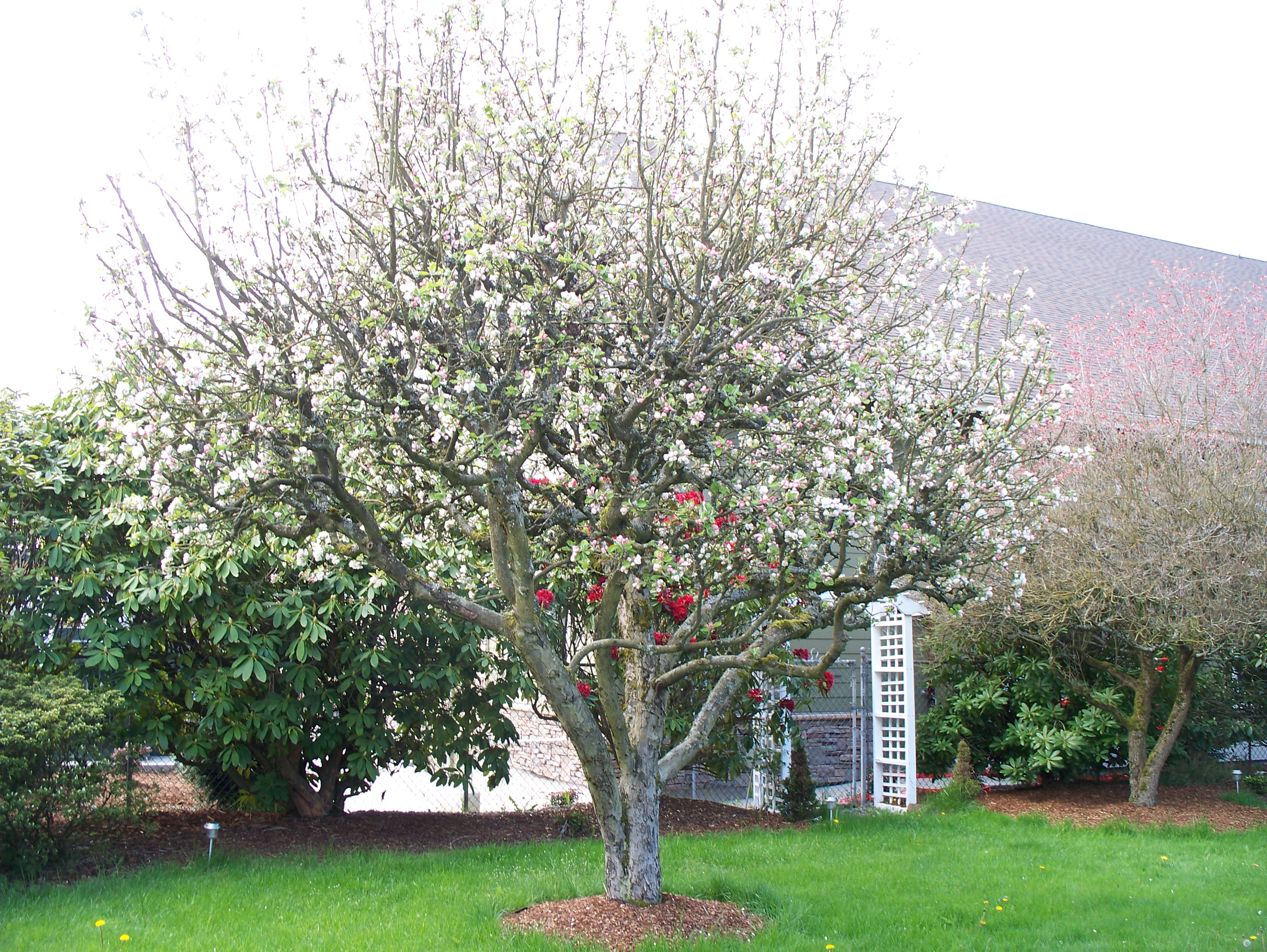
Apple blossoms in full bloom.

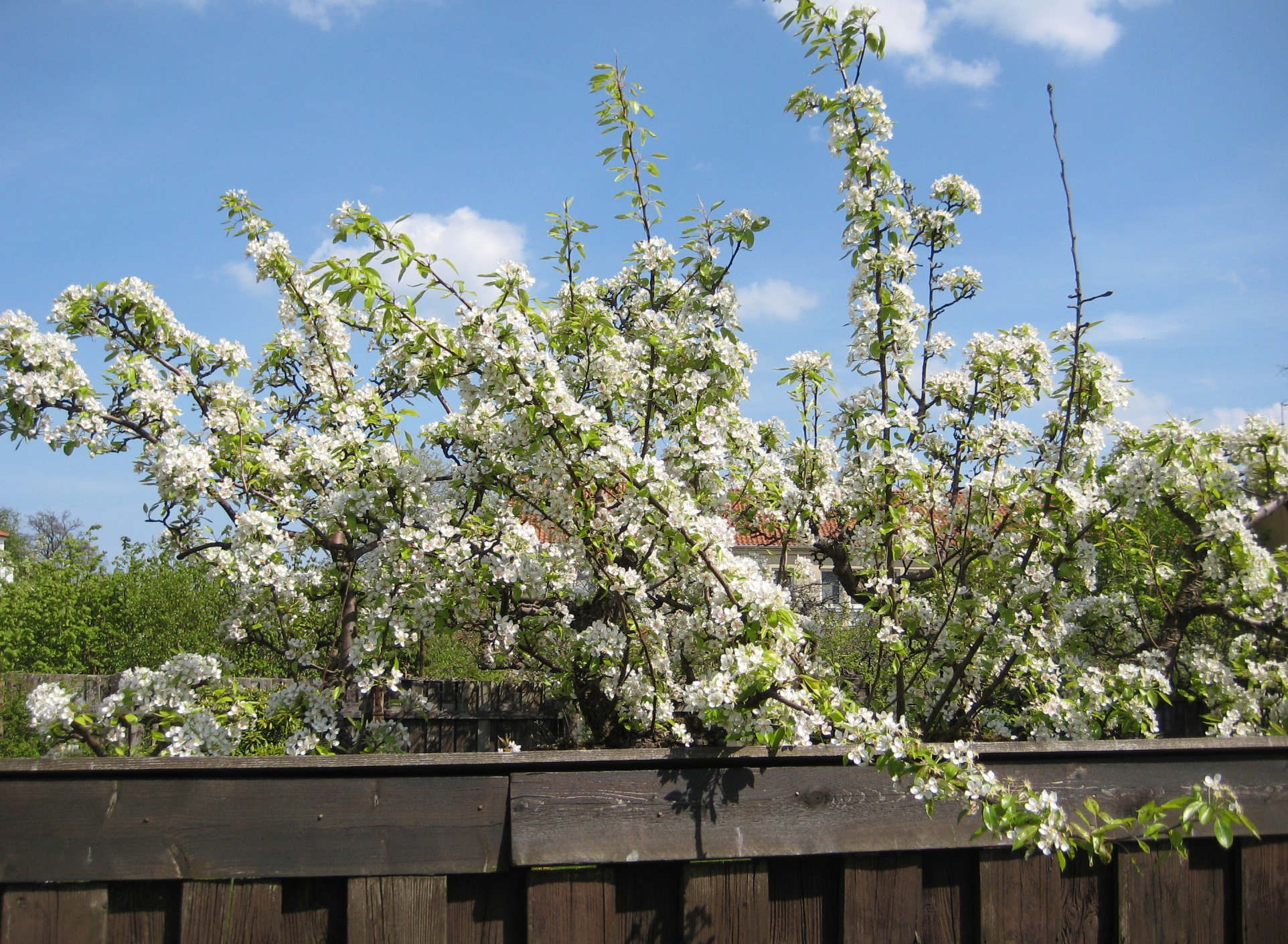
Pear blossoms in full bloom.

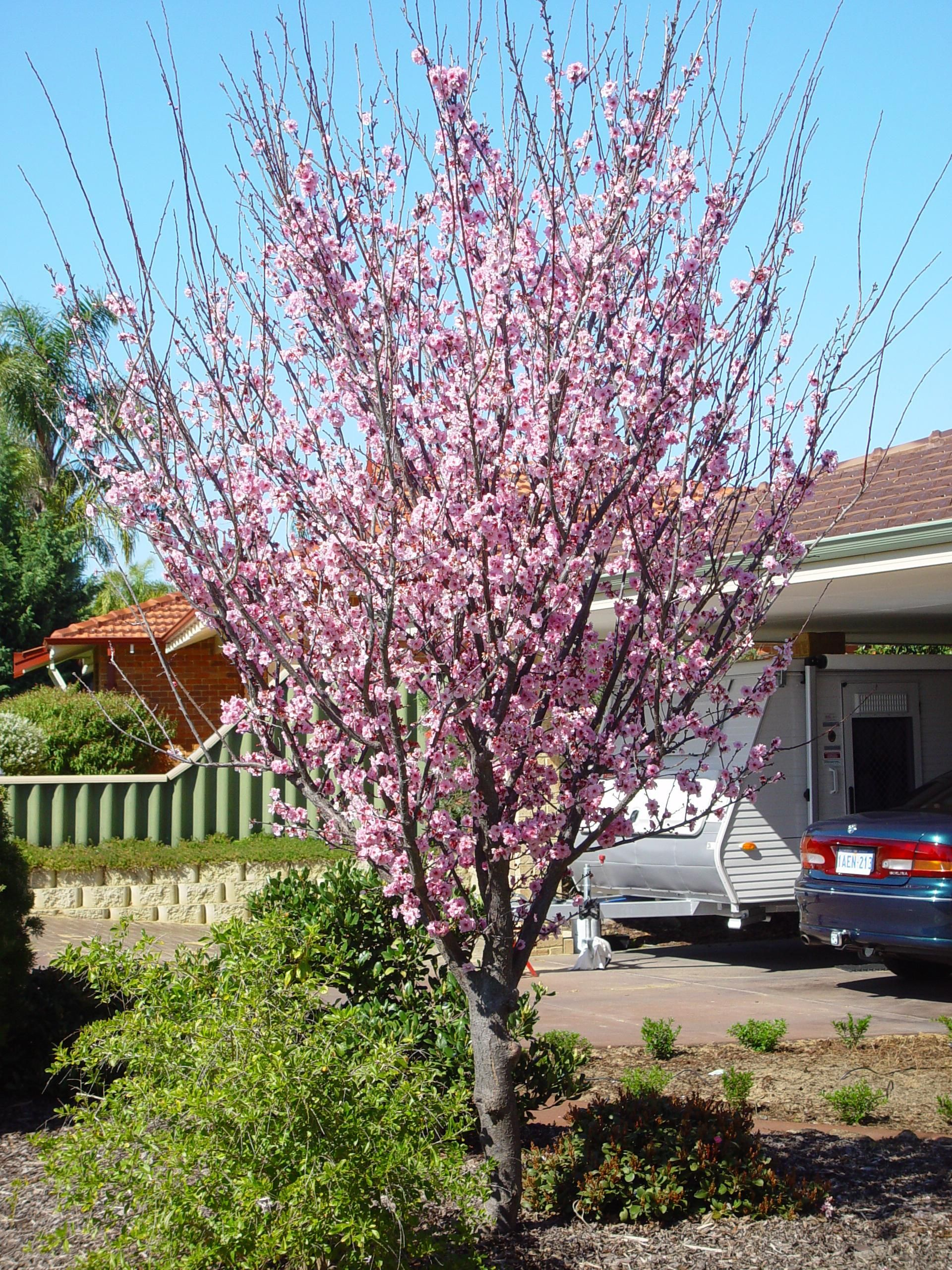
Plum blossoms in full bloom.

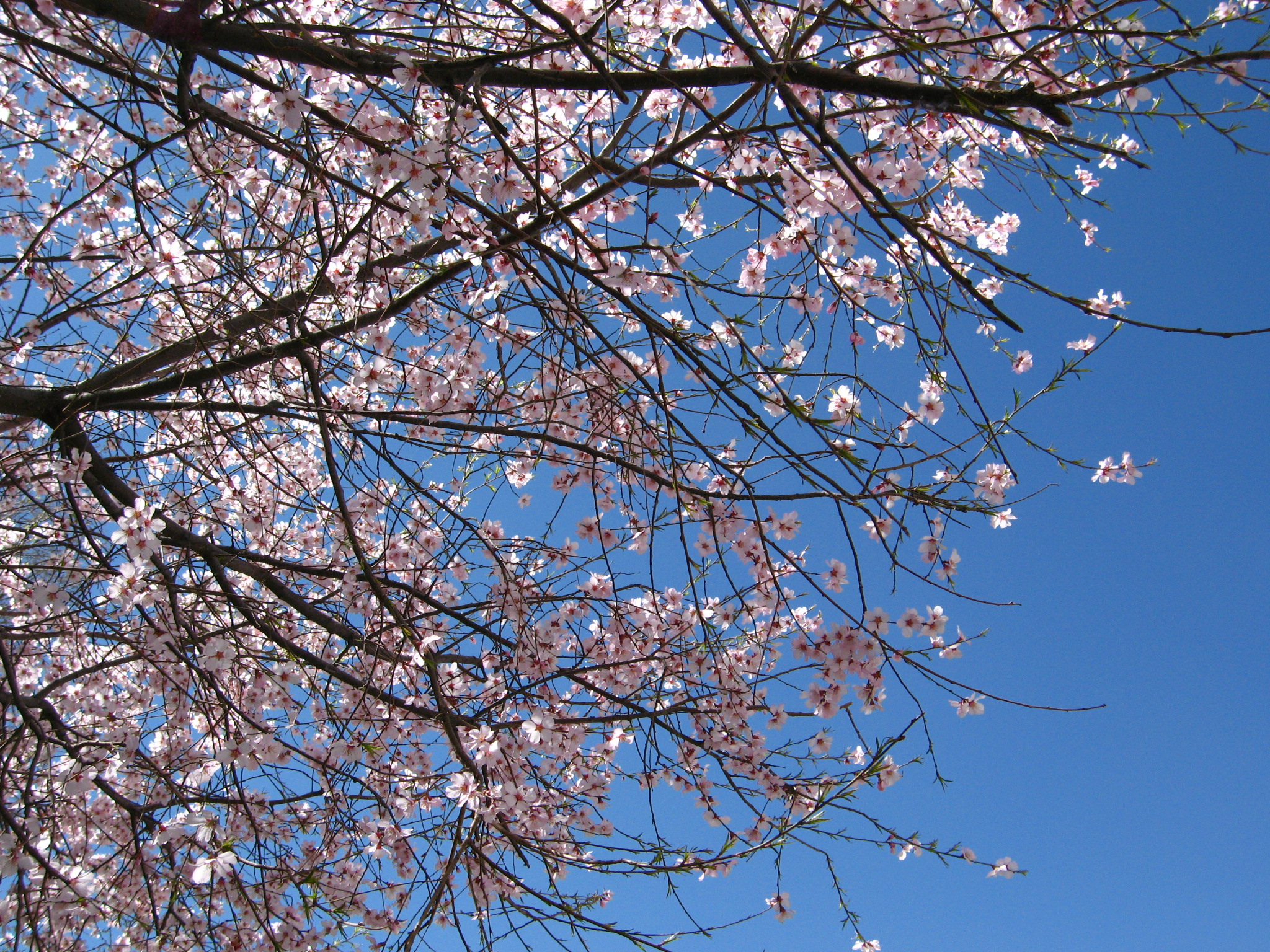
Peach blossoms in full bloom.

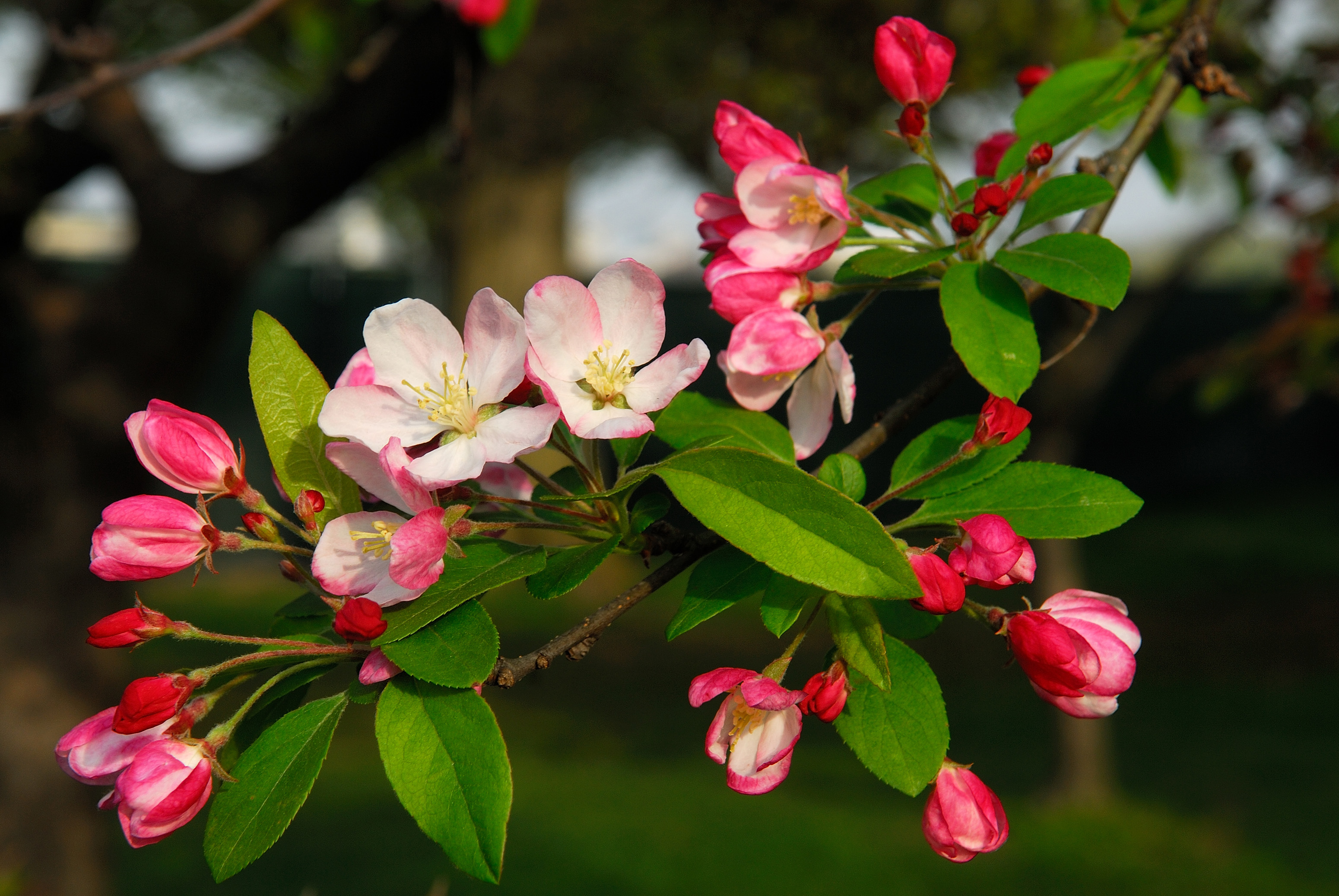
Crabapple blossoms.

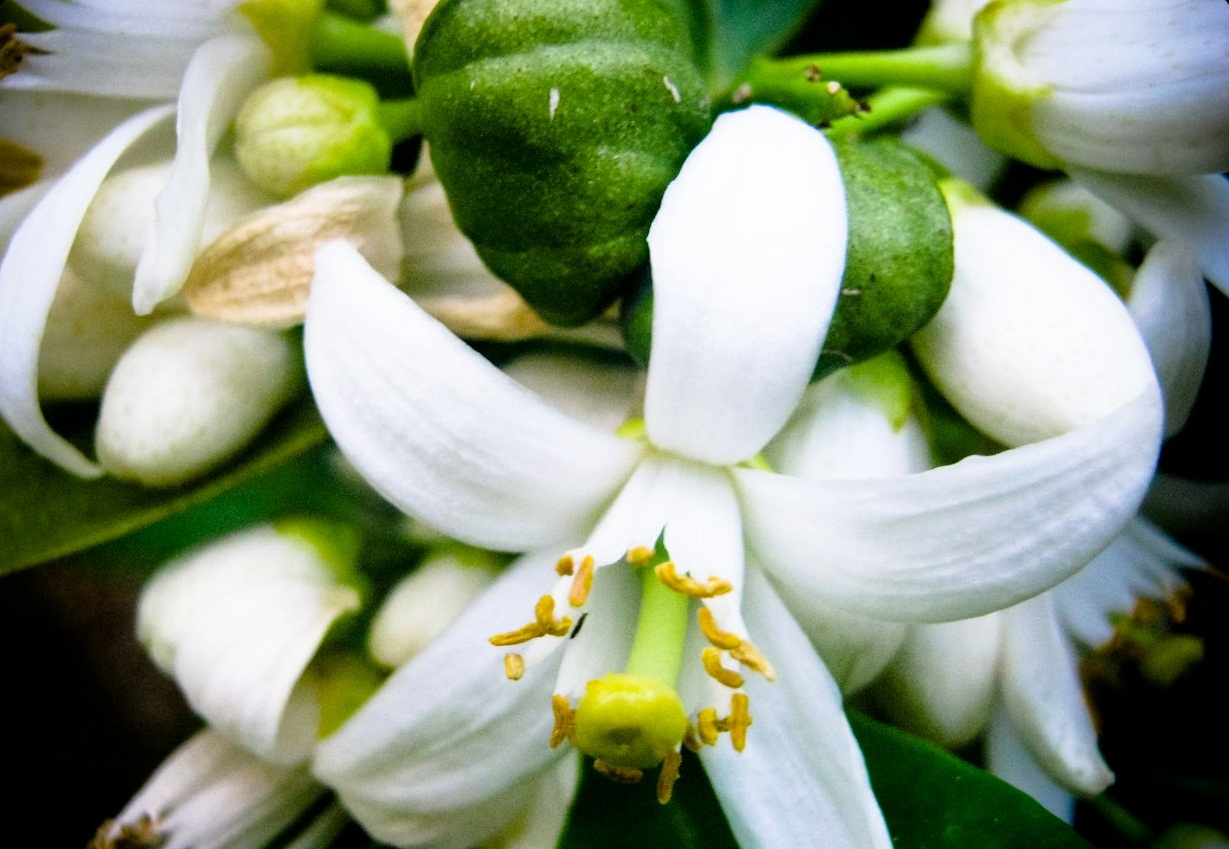
Lemon blossoms.

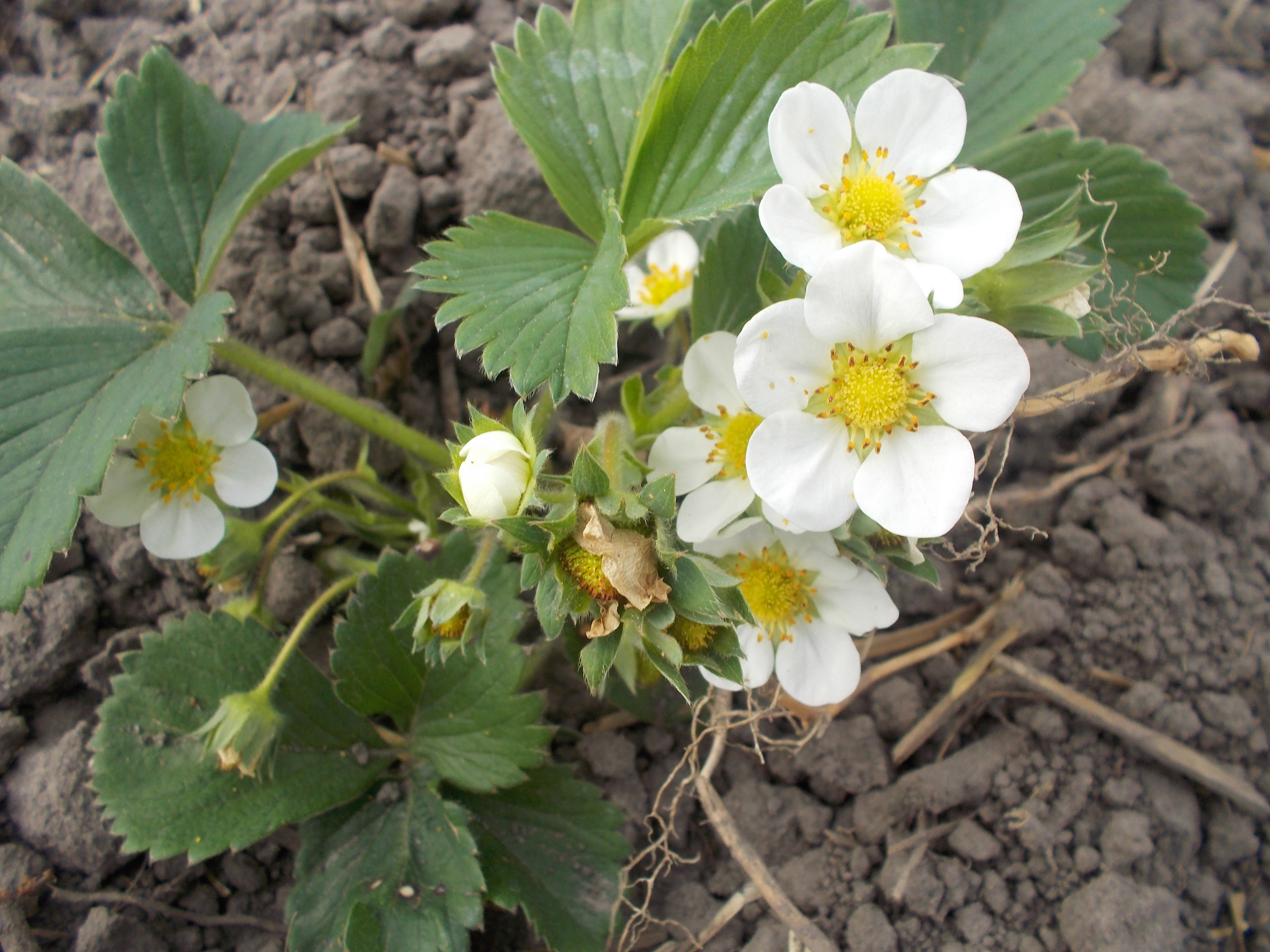
Strawberry blossoms.

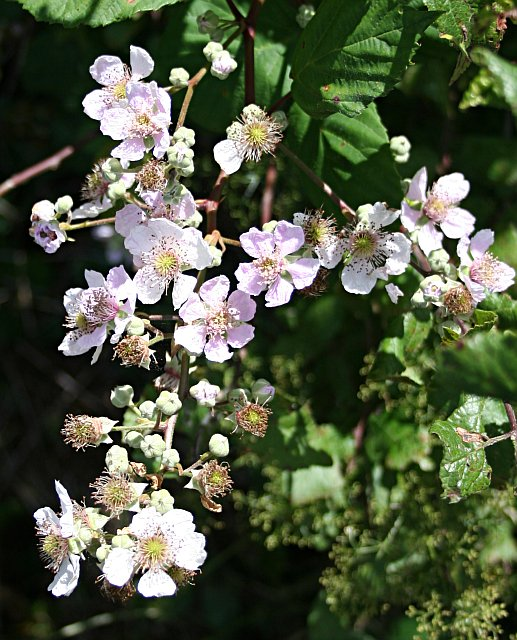
Blackberry blossoms.

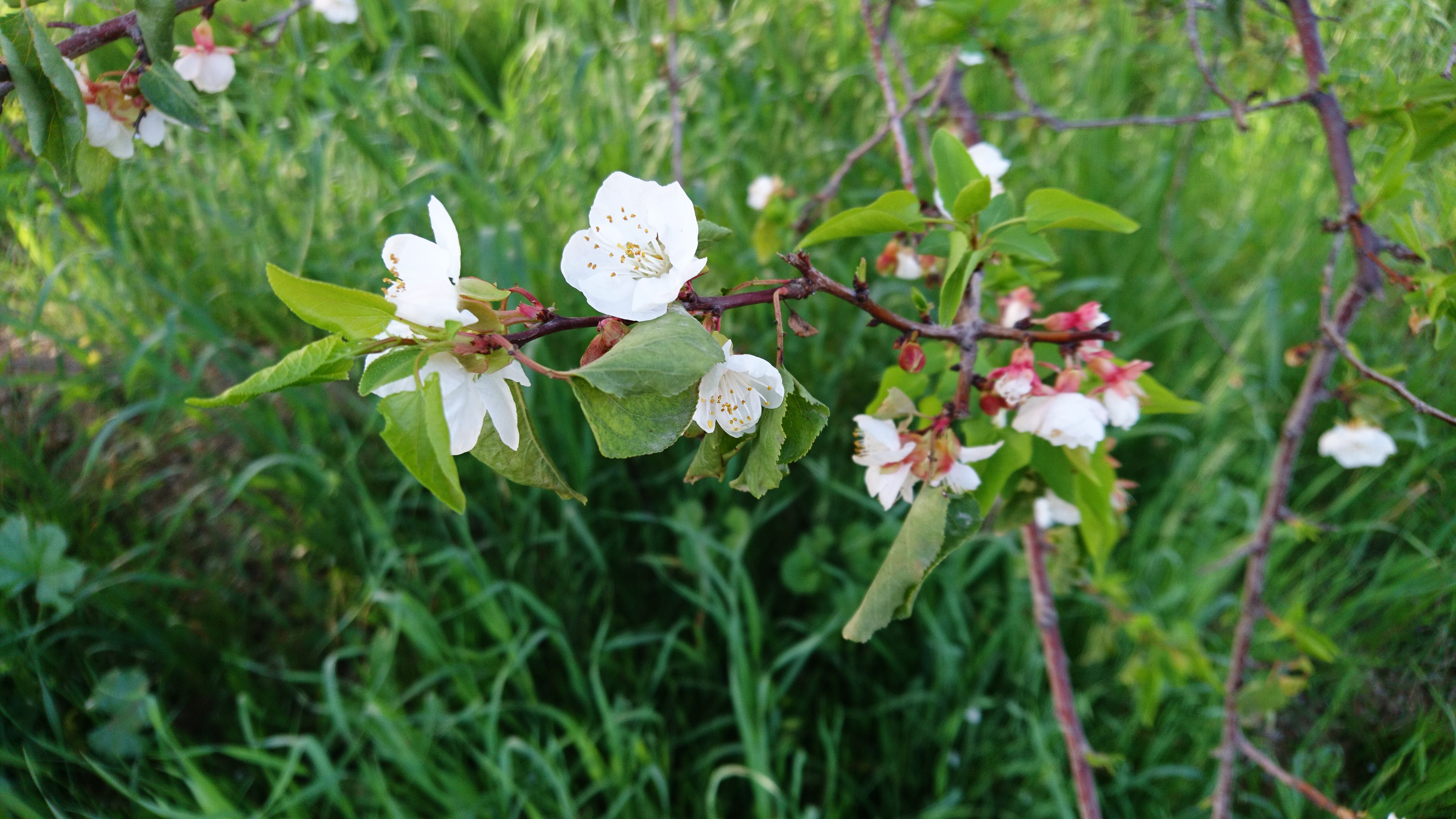
Apricot blossom in Behbahan, Iran

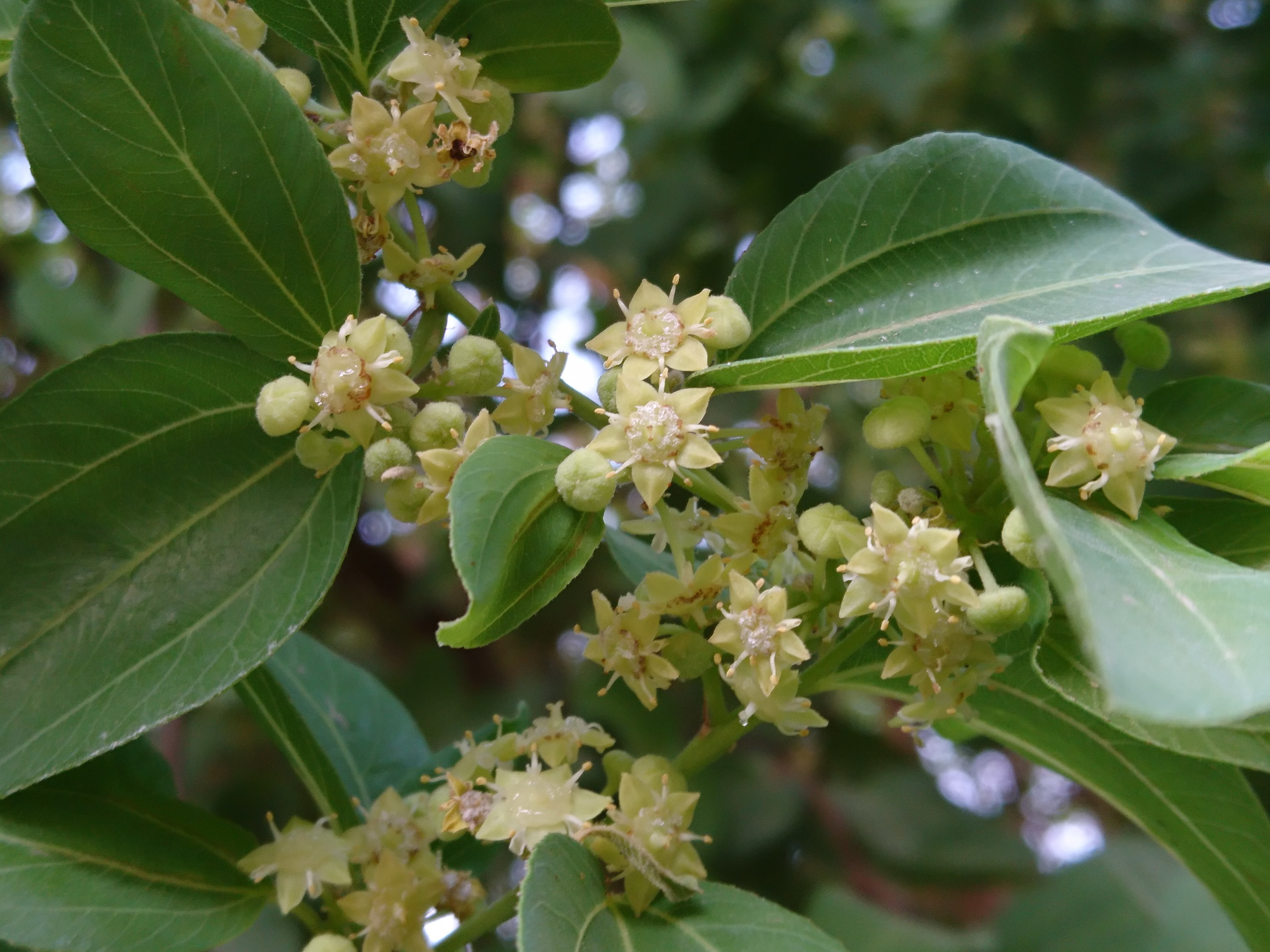
Ziziphus blossom in Behbahan, Iran

== See also ==
- Fragrance extraction
