= Overdenture =

Removable dental prosthesis

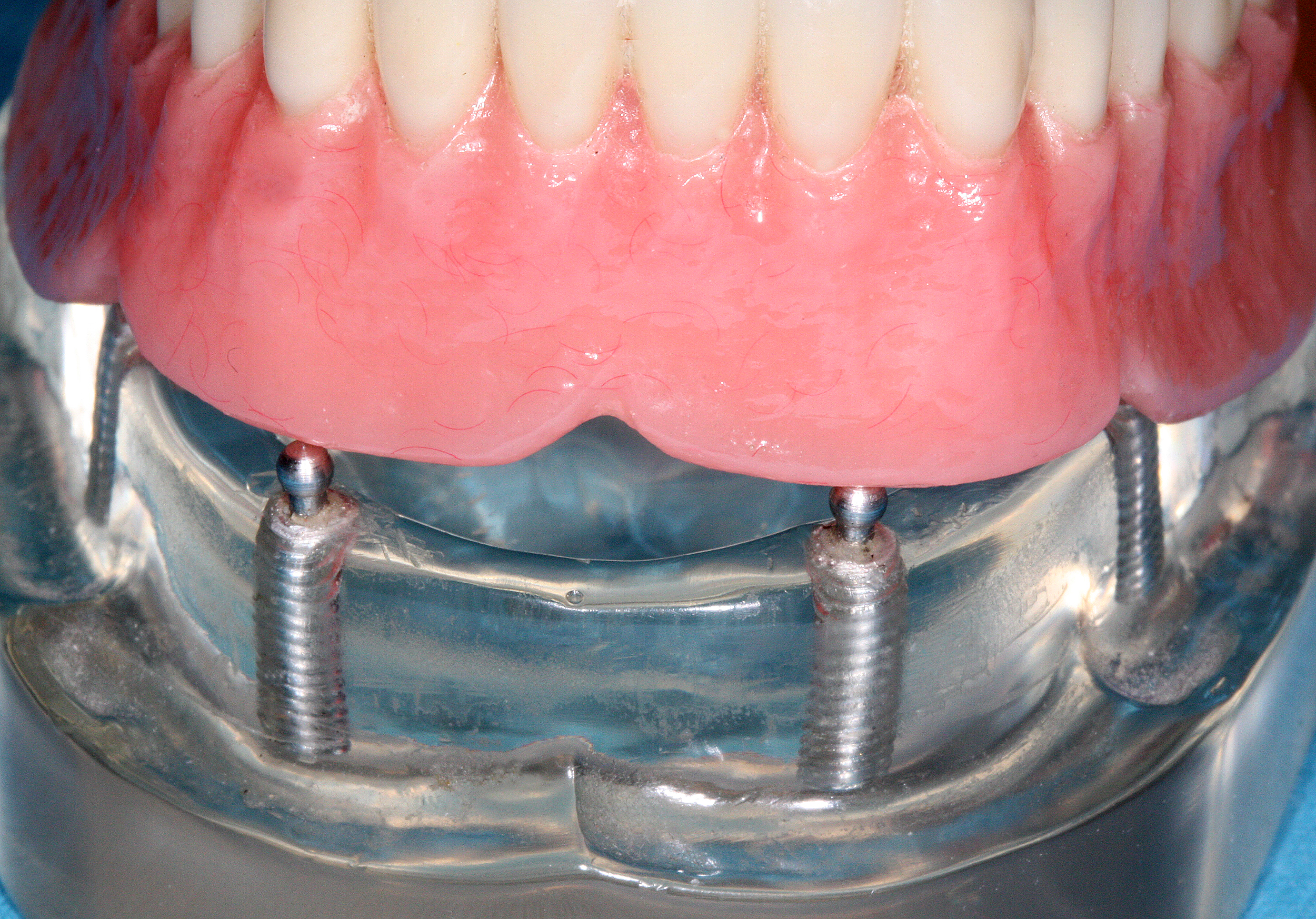
Overdenture resting on implants on a plastic model

Overdenture is any removable dental prosthesis that covers and rests on one or more remaining natural teeth, the roots of natural teeth, and/or dental implants. It is one of the most practical measures used in preventive dentistry. Overdentures can be either tooth supported (conventional / immediate) or implant supported. It is found to help in the preservation of alveolar bone and delay the process of complete edentulism.

An overdenture is a denture, the base of which covers one or more teeth, prepared roots or implants.

An overdenture is usually used for elderly patients that have lost some teeth but not all, rendering them suitable for a set of full dentures. The overdenture is not rigid in the mouth; it is removable.

An advantage of overdentures compared to full dentures is that the roots left in the maxilla (upper jaw) help preserve bone of the upper jaw, preventing bone resorption. Another advantage is that the sensory aspect is improved. The nerves in the roots are still present therefore sensation is improved greatly.

The gums around the teeth must be relatively healthy for an overdenture to not cause any further problems.

A maxillary overdenture may be supported by implants. Even though there is no solid evidence to prove how many implants would be ideal to stabilise an overdenture, the most common number of implants used to stabilise a maxillary denture is 4.

For a mandibular overdenture, support was better given by 2 implants than it was when only one implant was present. The patient could also chew much better and was overall more pleased with the overdenture.

At first, chewing capabilities are reduced however within 12 months of fitting the overdenture, the chewing cycle improves.

== Alternative Terminologies ==
- Overlay Denture
- Hybrid Prosthesis
- Telescoping Denture
- Tooth Supported Denture
- Onlay dentures
- Superimposed dentures

== Types ==
Overdentures can be classified into 2 categories, depending on the types of abutment providing support:

=== Types of Abutment ===
Tooth-supported

This type of overdenture overlies natural tooth structures. Frequently, elective root canal treatment and coronal modification are carried out on the teeth that are used as abutments. This means that the pulpal tissues and crowns of the natural teeth are removed, followed by contouring of the tooth structure above the gum. This allows even distribution of occlusal stress onto the abutment teeth and soft tissues. Other than that, retention of natural teeth in the jaw helps preserve bone by delaying the process of bone resorption in the jaw.

Selection of abutment teeth depends on a few factors including:

- Location

To provide adequate support, there should be one abutment tooth per quadrant and the abutment should ideally be a canine.

- Prognosis

The teeth selected to provide support should be healthy i.e. not decayed and no/ manageable gum disease, thus ensuring long term retention in the jaw.

- Feasibility of endodontic treatment

Most of the time, the crown of the abutment teeth has to be removed to allow space for placement of overdenture without interfering the bite. Therefore, the pulp has to be removed. If the root canals of the abutment teeth are obliterated, endodontic treatment is not required. Teeth with non-negotiable root canals should not be selected as abutments.

Implant-supported

Edentulous patients with sufficient amount of bony ridge on their jaws can opt for implant supported overdenture. This type of over denture gains support from both the dental implants and intraoral tissues. Having implant-supported overdenture provides better stability of prosthesis and reduce bone resorption. However, a conventional complete denture can be considered as an alternative due to less treatment time needed.

=== Types of Attachment System ===
Overdentures can be further classified according to the types of attachment system used. The attachment systems function to enhance retention and stability of the overdenture. Currently there isn't enough evidence to advocate a particular system and hence technical aspects are the main consideration when choosing it.

Stud attachments

This is the oldest system available and consists of a male (stud) and female (housing) component. It connects the over denture to the individual abutment.

Examples of stud attachments include:

- O-rings attachment: This system consists of a metal abutment analogue and a metal O-ring fitted with silicone ring.
- Extra-radicular attachment (ERA): This system is deemed most suitable for parallel implant abutments.
- Ball attachment: This is the simplest system, consisting of a ball and a socket. The ball (male unit) is made on the implant abutment while the socket (female unit) is incorporated on the fitting surface of the overdenture.
- Locator (self-aligning) attachment: This is the least commonly used stud attachment and is usually indicated when the implant abutments are non-parallel to each other.

Bars and clips

Bars function to connect the over denture to the splinted abutments. A clip or sleeve is then placed over the bar to hold the overdenture in place. Depending on their resiliency, bars can be made either a bar joint (resilient) or a bar unit (non-resilient/ rigid). Overall, this is the most popular attachment system due to its ability to stabilise overdenture and relatively higher wear resistance.

Magnets

This system consists of a magnet incorporated on the fitting surface of the overdenture and the magnet keeper fixed to the implant abutments. It is considered to be resilient and less retentive than the ball attachment, allowing movement of overdenture.

Telescopic

This system is more commonly used in overdentures supported by natural teeth rather than implants. It consists of a primary coping cemented to the abutments and a secondary coping, which is incorporated on the overdenture, to fit over the primary coping. Hence, it is also known as double crown, a crown and sleeve coping or Konuskrone.

== Indications ==
Retention and Stability

- If prescribing a removable prosthesis and there is limited remaining firm teeth in the dentition an overdenture may aid in retention and stability compared to that of a conventional removable prosthesis.

Preventative Dentistry

- The use of an overdenture delays the process of leaving the patient completely edentulous and assists in the preservation of bone.

- As a main priority for many dentists and patients, preventative dentistry is a reason for prescribing an overdenture as it retains the natural teeth for longer.

Patient Anatomy

- Overdentures can be useful for patients with a severe ridge defect or bone resorption.

- Patients who have unfavourable tongue positions and muscle attachment for a conventional removable prosthesis could find that an overdenture has increased retention and stability.

- If the patient has a superficially placed mental nerve, then the preferential choice of treatment may be to leave certain teeth in place in order to prevent damage to the nerve and prescribe an overdenture for any aesthetic needs.

Protection of Root Canal Filling

- An overdenture can be prescribed for a patient who has just had a root canal treatment completed to protect the coronal seal of the tooth if they are waiting to have fixed prosthodontics carried out on the tooth.

== Advantages ==
There are numerous advantages of overdentures when compared to conventional full or partial removable prosthesis. Overdentures can be supported and retained by natural roots left in situ or by dental implants. Implant retained dentures may be fixed or removable and are an option for the completely edentulous patient. They offer the benefits that a root supported overdenture provides.

Proprioception

When roots are retained and used for overdentures, preservation of the periodontal membrane maintains proprioceptive impulses so the patient is aware of occlusal contacts and can control occlusal forces as they did with natural teeth. Loss of proprioception is something which patients can struggle with accepting.

Bone Resorption

When teeth and roots are extracted, bone resorption ensues. This is greatest in the mandible and can be minimised by retaining roots. Mandibular bone loss was examined by Crum and Rooney 1978 in patients with immediate complete dentures and in those with immediate overdentures on two lower canines. They found over the five years after placement 0.6mm bone loss in the overdenture group and 5.2 mm in the immediate complete dentures in the anterior part of the mandible. This reduction in bone loss enables increased stability and retention of the overdenture which has psychological and functional advantages for the patient. Preservation of the alveolar ridge, especially with a lower prosthesis may improve patients comfort, chewing, phonetics and aesthetics allowing a better quality of life. A fixed implant retained denture is completely implant supported therefore further alveolar ridge resorption is avoided, unlike with a tissue supported prosthesis. An improvement in soft tissue health can also be seen.

== Complications ==
There are a number of complications that can arise once overdentures are fitted in the mouth. These can range from post insertion tissue changes to fracture of the prosthesis.

Damage to Periodontal Tissues

The most common reason for changes within the periodontal tissues is the lack of adequate oral hygiene. Plaque build up around overdenture abutments or precision attachments can lead to inflammation and hyperplasia of the gingiva. This can present as painful, red and swollen tissues, especially at the gingival margin. As a result, gingival recession may occur leading to exposure of the root surfaces to the oral environment. A study which looked at patients wearing overdentures found that the rate of tooth loss was in the order of 20% and was most commonly due to periodontal disease. Many of these failures could have been prevented with better oral hygiene methods.

Tooth Decay

Any remaining tooth structure within the oral cavity is subject to developing caries and is often the result of lack of topical fluoride application, poor diet and poor oral hygiene. Caries can be found at the root face or root surface where gingival recession has occurred. It is important to encourage patients to use a fluoride containing toothpaste over the denture abutments to minimise tooth surface loss and risk further infection.

Bone Resorption

Another tissue change that can result from wearing an overdenture is resorption of the alveolar bone. Although retention of a root prevents the alveolar bone from resorbing, at a distant site from the overdenture abutment the bone is susceptible to gradual resorption. This could lead to instability of the denture and uneven loading over time. There is then a potential for the denture to irritate the mucosa due to repeated movement against the tissues.

Denture Stomatitis

Denture stomatitis is a common problem in full and partial denture wearers, and so can also be seen in patients wearing overdentures. It is an example of a yeast infection and can arise due to various factors, for example poor oral hygiene, hyposalivation and poor diet. Common signs include ulcers, red and white patches or both. It is important to encourage good denture hygiene methods and it may be necessary to provide a new denture.

Fractured Prosthesis

As well as damage to intra-oral tissues there is also a possibility of fracture of the prosthesis itself. Overdentures retained by attachments have been found to be more likely to fracture. A study looking at implant retained mandibular overdentures compared the risk of fracture between one implant retained denture and two. The results showed that the incidence of denture base fracture was not significantly different between the presence of one or two implants but when a fracture did occur it was found to be in areas around the implants.

== Research & evidence ==
A 10-year observational period found that implants which supported overdentures in the mandible had a survival rate ranging from 91.7% to 100%. Furthermore, implant survival rates with respect to their attachment system were found to be best for the ball type attachment which was an average of 95.8 - 97.5%, followed by the bar and magnet ranging from 96.2 - 100%, and 91.7% respectively.
