= Subepithelial connective tissue graft =

Surgical procedure in dentistry

1. Recipient site exhibits gingival recession on both premolars and first molar (molar recession is not an esthetic issue and will not be treated); 2. Incisions prior to flap reflection; 3. Full thickness flap elevated; 4. Another viewpoint of the flapped recipient site

In dentistry, the subepithelial connective tissue graft (SECT graft, and sometimes referred to simply as a connective tissue (CT) graft) is an oral and maxillofacial surgical procedure first described by Alan Edel in 1974. Currently, it is generally used to obtain root coverage following gingival recession, which was a later development by Burt Langer in the early 1980s.

== Terminology ==
Similar to the free gingival graft, the SECT graft can be described as a free autogenous graft.

- The term free describes how the graft is completely removed from the donor site rather than remaining attached via a pedicle.
- The term autogenous, from the Greek root auto- ("self"), describes how the individual who receives the graft is the same individual who provides the donor tissue.

The connective tissue is generally taken from the hard palate, although it may be taken from other sites as well, such as the maxillary tuberosity area. Because the connective tissue for the graft is transplanted without the superficial epithelium from the donor site, it is termed subepithelial.

== History ==
As initially described by Edel, the treatment objective was to increase the zone of keratinized tissue. Others, including Broome and Taggert and Donn also described the use of SECT grafts for increasing the zone of keratinized tissue.

Of the various ways of preparing the graft recipient site, Edel described using two vertical incisions, mesial and distal to the teeth at which the zone of keratinized tissue was intended to be widened.

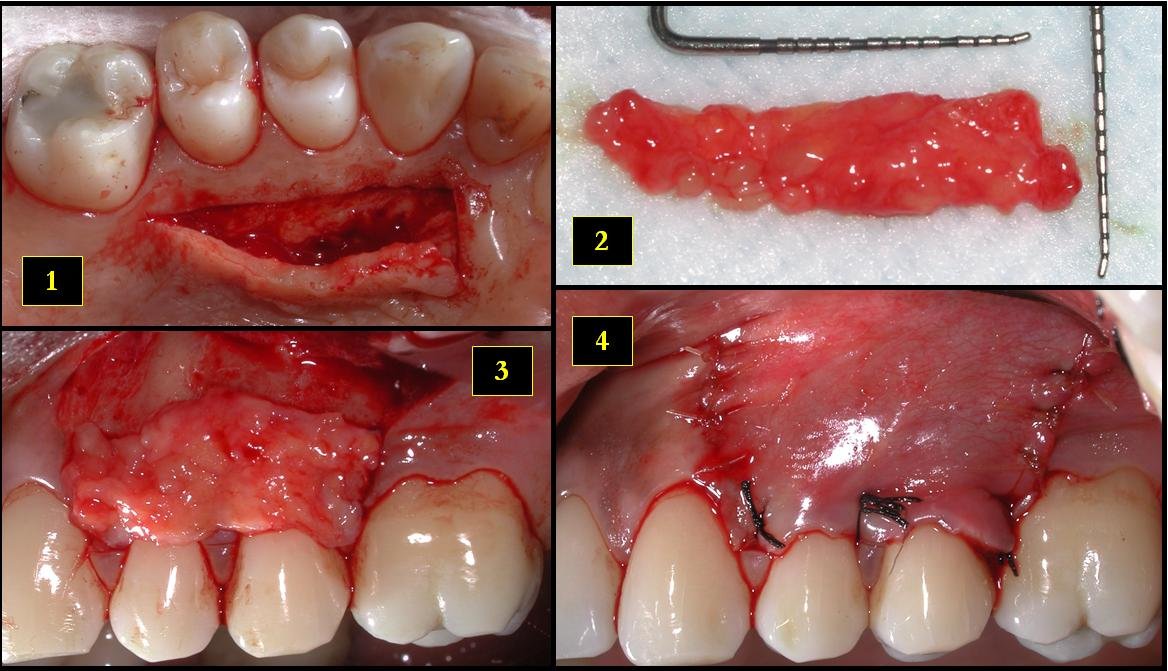
1. Ipsilateral palatal mucosa serving as the donor site; 2. The retrieved connective tissue, approximately 25 × 6 mm in dimension; 3. Connective tissue placed at recipient site; 4. Recipient site flap coronally advanced and sutured to entirely cover the graft

At the donor site, Edel described three methods for choosing and preparing the donor site to obtain connective tissue for the SECT graft:

1. palatal partial thickness flap
2. palatal full-partial thickness flap
3. tuberosity partial thickness flap

Contrary to the donor site for a free gingival graft, the surgeon is able to achieve primary closure at the donor site for a SECT.

Langer later described the SECT as a method by which to augment concavities and irregularities of the alveolar ridge following traumatic extractions, advanced periodontitis or developmental defects. Currently, though, such augmentation of hard tissue defects tends to be done with hard tissue replacements, namely bone graft materials.

However, it was only in 1985 that Langer proposed the SECT for root coverage following gingival recession.

== Advantages ==
The SECT graft is a sort of hybrid procedure that combines the pedicle flap with the free gingival graft and enjoys the benefits of both. Pedicle flaps alone, such as the coronally advanced flap, frequently suffer from retraction and muscle pull.

== Technique ==
Although there are various ways in which to carry out this procedure, all share a common sequence of steps:

1. Prepare the recipient site of tissue exhibiting recession by incising the gingivae
2. Obtain the SECT from the donor site
3. Secure the SECT at the recipient site
4. Suture the incised gingival tissue at both the donor and recipient sites

The donor site might be sutured closed either before or after securing the donor tissue to the recipient site
