= Ball attachment (dentistry) =

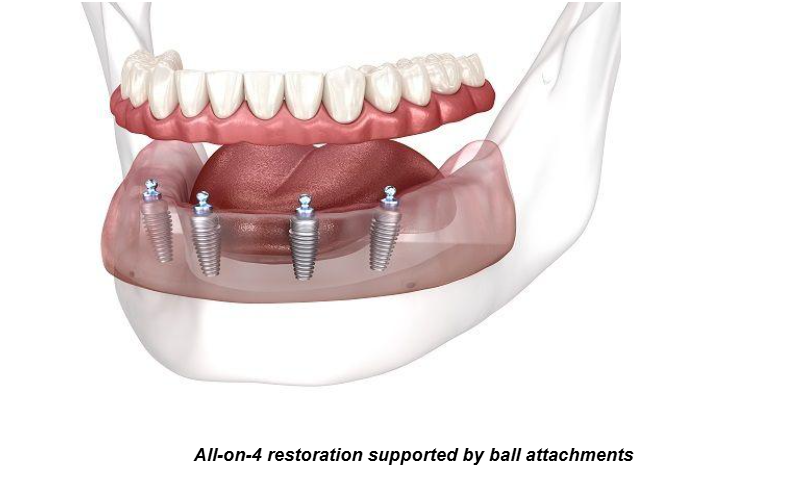
Ball attachment (dentistry)

A ball attachment is a dental component commonly used in implant-retained and tooth-supported overdentures to enhance prosthetic retention, stability, and function. It consists of a ball-shaped male abutment that fits into a corresponding female housing, creating a mechanical connection that allows controlled movement while maintaining secure placement.

== Design and Components ==
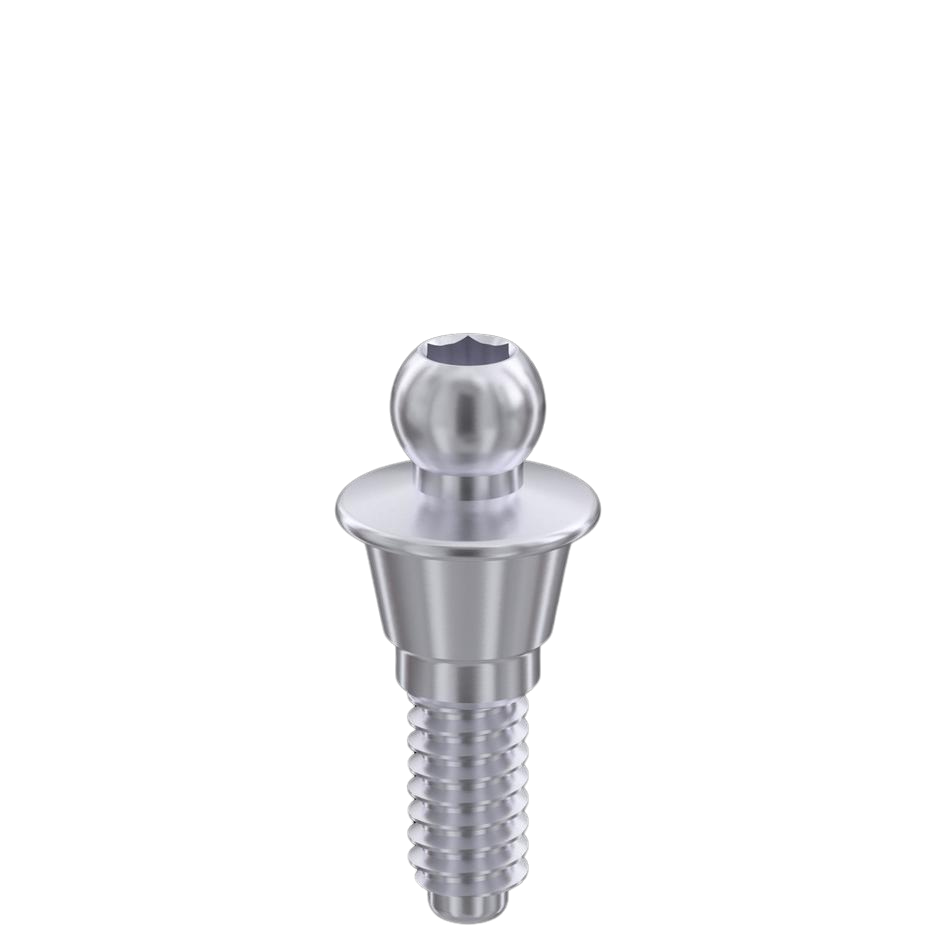
Ball attachment abutment internal hex regular platform

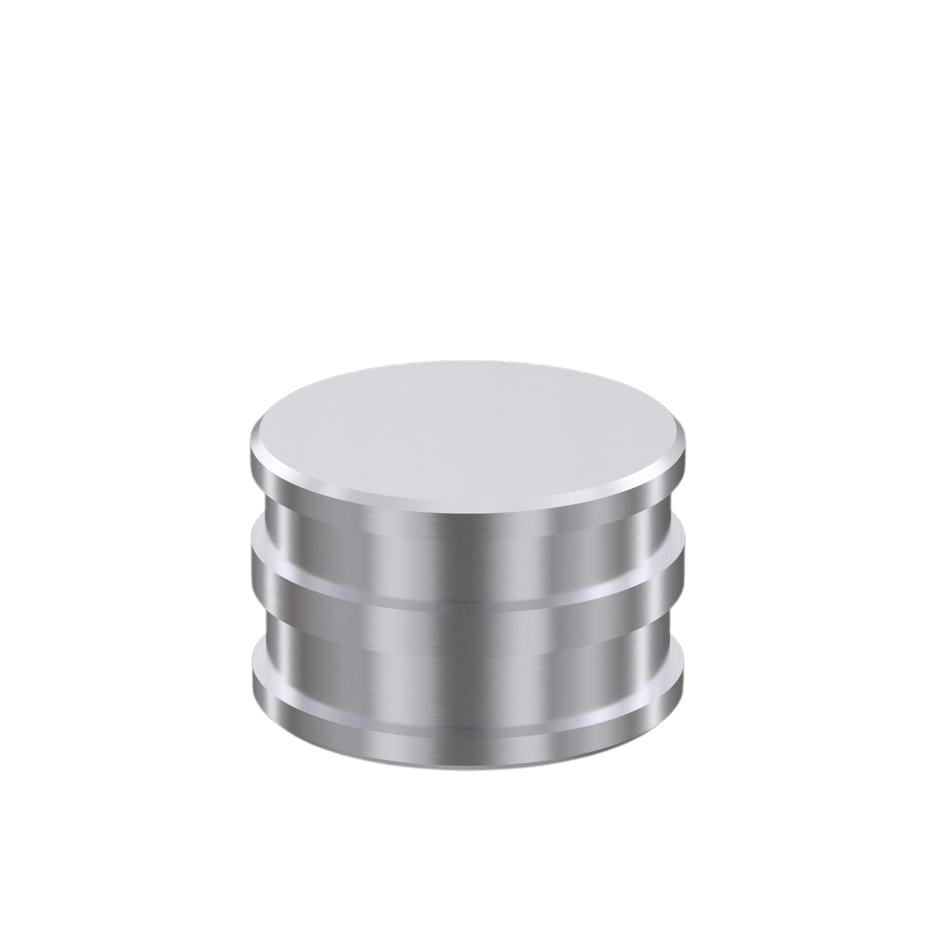
Housing cap for ball attachment

Ball attachments function as precision mechanical retention devices in dental prostheses. They typically consist of:

- Male Component (Ball Abutment) – A spherical attachment fixed onto a dental implant, a natural tooth root, or a bar structure. It is available in various sizes and materials, including titanium and gold-plated alloys.
- Female Component (Housing and Retentive Insert) – A socket-like structure embedded within the denture, often lined with a replaceable retentive insert made of nylon or other resilient materials. The insert provides flexibility and retention, gripping the ball abutment securely.

== Applications in Dentistry ==
Ball attachments are used in various prosthodontic applications, including:

=== Implant-Retained Overdentures ===
Ball attachments are frequently employed in implant-supported overdentures to fix overdenture (ball attachment abutment) or to improve denture retention and function (for bar structure), particularly in cases of complete edentulism. The attachment system allows slight movements, reducing stress on implants while ensuring sufficient stability for mastication and speech.

=== Tooth-Supported Overdentures ===
In cases where natural tooth roots are preserved, ball attachments can be placed on prepared roots or post-supported restorations. This approach maintains proprioception (natural sensation), minimizes bone resorption, and enhances denture retention.

=== Partial Dentures ===
Ball attachments can also be used in removable partial dentures (RPDs) to provide additional support and retention, particularly when conventional clasps are inappropriate or aesthetically undesirable.

== Materials and Types ==
Ball attachments come in a variety of materials and configurations, each with its own properties. Titanium ball attachments are widely used in implant restorations due to their high biocompatibility and lightweight nature. Gold-plated ball attachments, on the other hand, provide enhanced durability and better frictional control. Some systems incorporate plastic or resilient inserts, which offer different levels of retention and cushioning to improve patient comfort. Additionally, the spherical shape of the ball attachment allows you to adjust the angle of deflection of the implants up to 11 degrees on each attachment

== Clinical Procedure ==
The process of incorporating ball attachments into dental prostheses involves several steps:

1. Case Evaluation and Planning – Assessment of oral health, bone quality, and prosthetic requirements.
2. Placement of Implants or Tooth Preparation – Surgical insertion of implants or modification of natural teeth to receive the attachment.
3. Attachment Installation – Fixing the ball abutment or bar with ball attachment onto the implant or prepared root structure.
4. Denture Fabrication and Housing Placement – Creating the overdenture with a corresponding female housing.
5. Retention Testing and Adjustments – Ensuring proper fit, retention strength, and patient comfort.

== Advantages and Disadvantages ==
Advantages:

- Improved Retention: Ball attachments provide strong retention for overdentures, reducing movement and increasing stability.
- Ease of Use: They are simple to insert and remove, making them a convenient option for patients with limited dexterity.
- Cost-Effective: Compared to other attachment systems, ball attachments are relatively affordable while still offering good functionality.
- Compatibility: They can be used with various implant systems and are suitable for different clinical situations.

Disadvantages:

- Maintenance Requirements: Regular cleaning is necessary to prevent plaque buildup and attachment wear.
- Wear and Tear: The O-ring or matrix component may degrade over time, requiring replacement.
- Limited Longevity: Compared to more advanced attachment systems (e.g., bar or locator attachments), ball attachments may have a shorter lifespan.
- Vertical Space Requirement: Ball attachments require sufficient vertical space, which may not be ideal for patients with low interarch space.
