= Gingival grafting =

Surgery in which gum tissue is grafted

Gingival graft
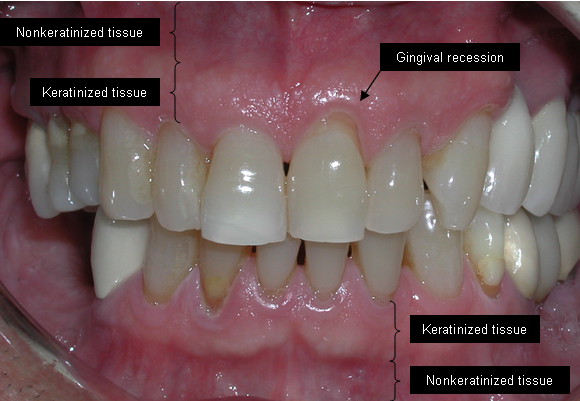
- ICD-9-CM: 24.2-24.3
- [edit on Wikidata]

In periodontology, gingival grafting, also called gum grafting or periodontal plastic surgery, is a generic term for the performance of any of a number of surgical procedures in which the gingiva (gum tissue) is grafted. The aim may be to cover exposed root surfaces or merely to augment the band of keratinized tissue.

== Anatomy ==
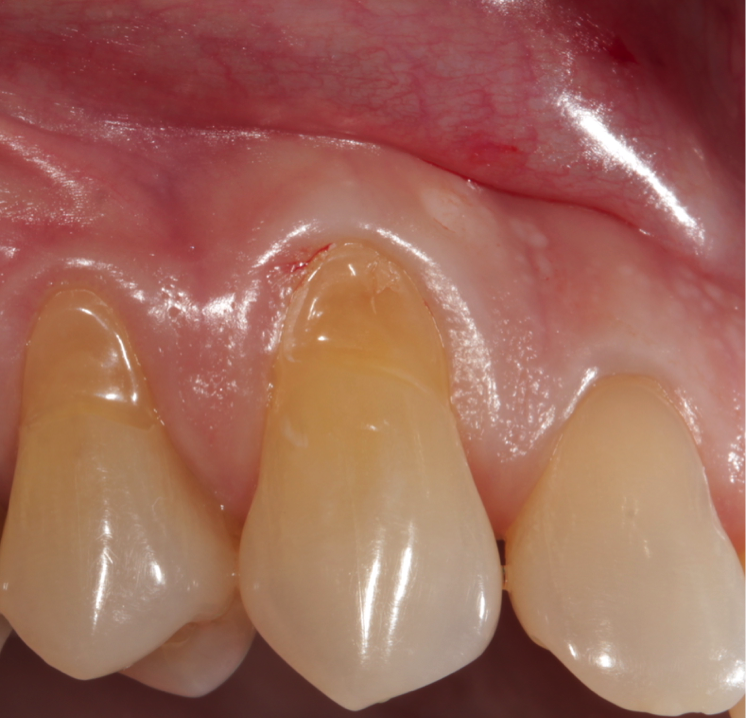
Gums showing recession

The soft tissue in the oral cavity is classified as either keratinized or nonkeratinized based on the presence of keratin in the epithelium. In health, the soft tissue immediately around the teeth is keratinized and is referred to as keratinized tissue or gingiva. Alveolar mucosa is non keratinized oral epithelium and is located apical to the keratinized tissue, delineated by the mucogingival junction (MGJ). It should also be pointed out that mucosa can surround a tooth in health. Nonkeratinized tissue also lines the cheeks (buccal mucosa), underside of the tongue and floor of the mouth. The lips contain both non-keratinized tissue (on the inside) and keratinized tissue on the outside, demarcated by the vermillion border. The dorsum of the tongue is keratinized and features many papillae, some of which contain taste buds.

Exposure of the tooth root due to loss of keratinized tissue around the neck of a tooth is referred to as gingival recession. This can result in sensitivity or pain from the exposed tooth root surface (dentin is more permeable and soft compared to enamel and dentin is what makes up the tooth root). Recession may also cause an unasthetic appearance especially if located in the anterior dentition (front teeth). While not all cases of gingival recession require surgical correction, there are various options if that is what the patient desires. It should be reinforced that recession left untreated will not result in tooth loss, contrary to popular belief. Also, recession that is left untreated can be maintained and the inflammation kept at bay with proper brushing and oral hygiene technique. On the other hand, if one desires to pursue corrective therapy, there are a wide variety of techniques ranging from autograft (one's own tissue, usually taken from the palate), allograft (another's tissue, cadaver tissue), xenograft (animal tissue, usually porcine or bovine) or simply repositioning of the tissue native to the site.

== Rationale ==
Gum grafting, also known as a gingival graft or periodontal plastic surgery, is a surgical procedure to reverse gum recession. Gum recession exposes the roots of teeth, which can lead to sensitivity and put teeth at a higher risk of damage or disease due to the loosening of their attachment within the gums and bones of the jaw. Should gum recession continue, bone and keratinized tissue will be at greater risk of being damaged and permanently lost around the teeth. The aim of a gum graft is to extend keratinized tissue of the gums to cover tooth roots, which restores their firm placement within the jaw and prevents further damage.

== Techniques ==
Traditional gum grafting will have a piece of the gums harvested from the roof of the mouth and sutured facing the exposed root to increase the lost keratinized tissue. The limited amount of donor tissue available from the palate and morbidity are the limiting factors of this technique. Allografting can be used to supply the surgeon with larger amount of tissues when needed, but complications in healing and the risk of possible disease transmission should be considered and disclosed to the patient when opting for such technique.

=== Advanced platelet-rich fibrin ===
Blood-derived growth factors have been used in medicine and oral surgery for more than twenty years with an abundance of scientific data supporting its role in soft and hard tissue regeneration. APRF, introduced by Dr. Joseph Choukroun, represents the fourth improved generation of such technology and has been widely used in the field of dentistry and oral surgery. Advantages of APRF include no risk of rejection or disease transmission (using your own blood) and improved healing (autogenous growth factors, hematopoietic or mesenchymal stem cells).

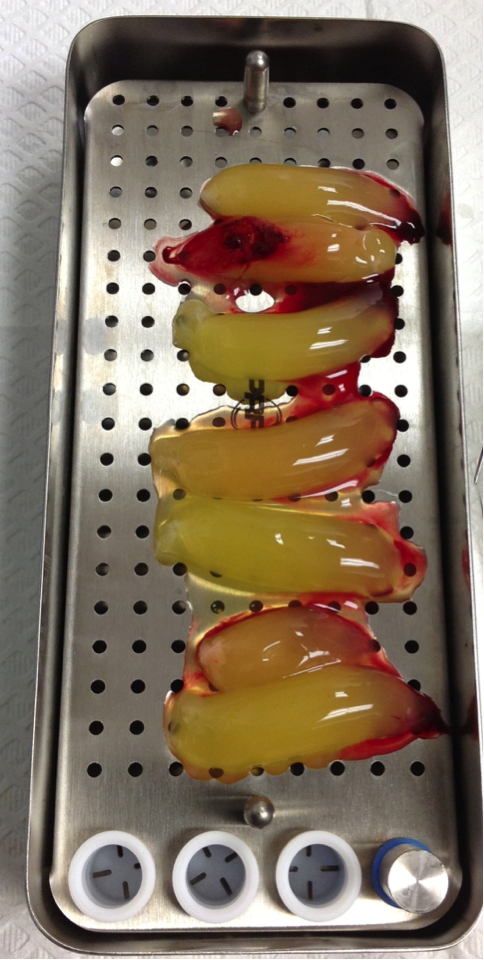
Platelet-rich fibrin clots being prepared for use

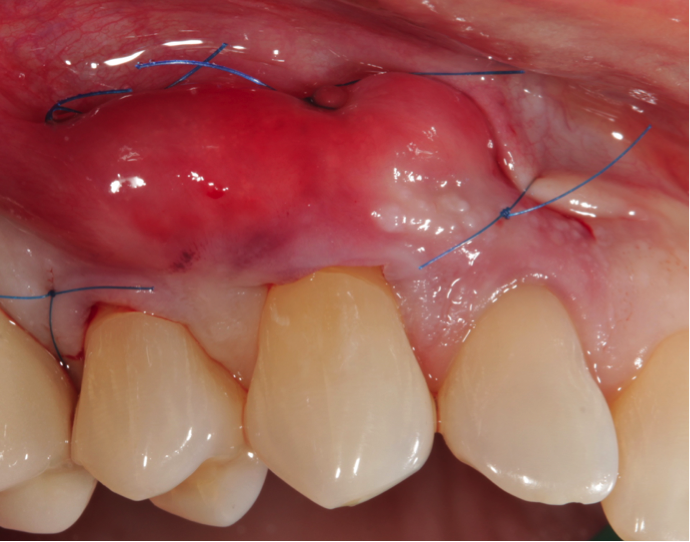
Gums sutured during a graft

A small amount of blood (10 millilitres (0.35 imp fl oz; 0.34 US fl oz) per tube) is harvested and spun in a centrifuge for eight minutes at 1300 RPM. A fibrin clot packed with blood-derived growth factors, extracellular matrix and hematopoietic stem cells is fabricated and implanted into the gums above the area of gum recession. Advanced platelet-rich fibrin stimulates tissue growth in the patient's own gums eliminating the need to harvest tissue from the palate or the use of allografting.

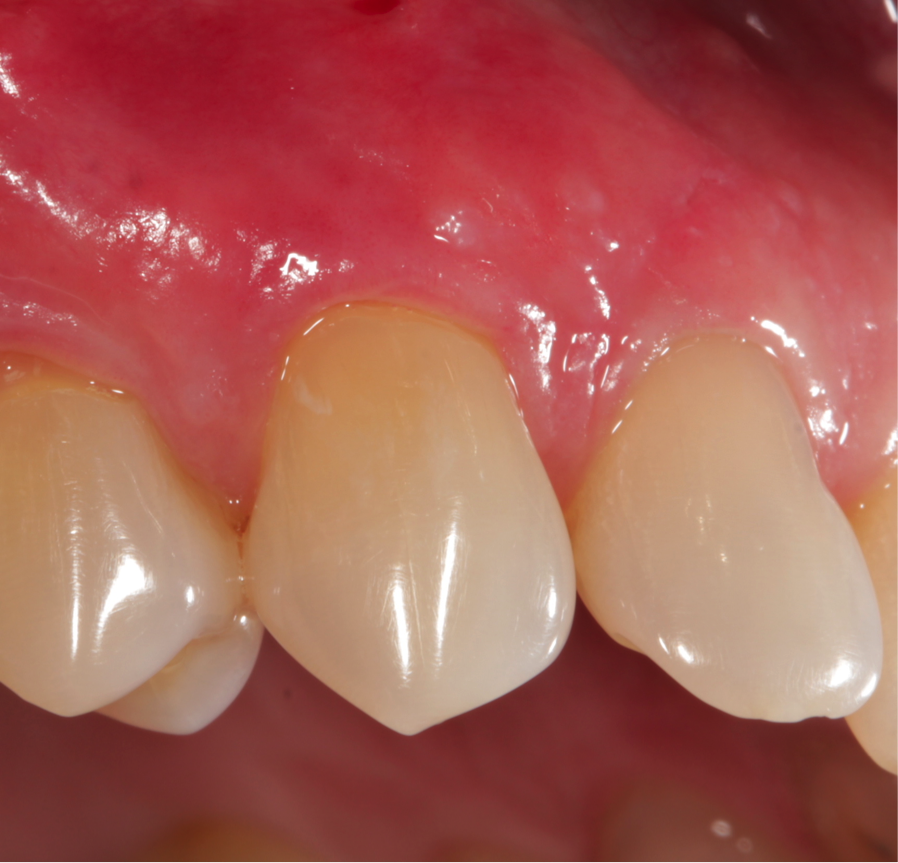
Post-gingival graft

Following this procedure, patients have an improved quality of recovery and require less recovery time due to enhanced healing factors.

== Specific procedures ==
Coronally and apically positioned flaps, although technically not grafting procedures, are other forms of a pedicle grafts in that gingival tissue is freed up and moved either coronally or apically. This requires adequate thickness and width of gingival tissue at the base of the recession defect.

A free gingival graft is a dental procedure where a small layer of tissue is removed from the palate of the patient's mouth and then relocated to the site of gum recession. It is sutured (stitched) into place and will serve to protect the exposed root as living tissue. The donor site will heal over a period of time without damage. This procedure is often used to increase the thickness of very thin gum tissue.

A subepithelial connective tissue graft takes tissue from under healthy gum tissue in the palate, which may be placed at the area of gum recession. This procedure has the advantage of excellent predictability of root coverage, as well as decreased pain at the palatal donor site compared to the free gingival graft. The subepithelial connective tissue graft is a common procedure for covering exposed roots.

A lateral pedicle graft, or pedicle graft, takes tissue from the area immediately adjacent to the damaged gingiva. This is not always an option, as the constraint that there must be sufficient tissue immediately lateral to the area of interest is an onerous one. When this procedure is performed, the transplant tissue is cut away and rotated over the damaged area. This can place the donor area at risk of recession as well.

An acellular dermal matrix (such as Alloderm) graft uses donated medically processed human skin tissue as a source for the graft. The advantage of this procedure is no need for a palatal donor site, and though some periodontists consider it equally successful as a subepithelial connective tissue graft, others consider it less successful.

Guided bone reconstruction is a technique in which bone growth is enhanced by preventing soft tissue ingrowth into the desired area and utilizes either resorbable or nonresorbable membranes. Both metallic membranes and membranes supported by a titanium frame have been tested and have been successful.

Through the advent of micro-surgical procedures these procedures have become more predictable and comfortable for the patients. Gum grafts are usually performed by periodontists who are trained in these procedures, though general-purpose dentists may offer the procedures themselves. Outcome comparisons between both are highly variable, though with periodontists being specially-trained, periodontists generally recommend patients seeking their services over general-practice dentists. A literature review in 2018 showed that the amount of gum recession patients had was reduced after most types of root coverage periodontal surgery procedures. Reported unwanted outcomes were discomfort and pain, mostly related to the site where the tissue graft was taken. This usually occurred in the first week after surgery and had no influence on root coverage outcomes. Currently, more research is needed to determine whether one root coverage technique is more effective than others.

== See also ==
- Gingival recession
- Periodontitis
- Subepithelial connective tissue graft
