= BlossomWatch =

Environmental campaign

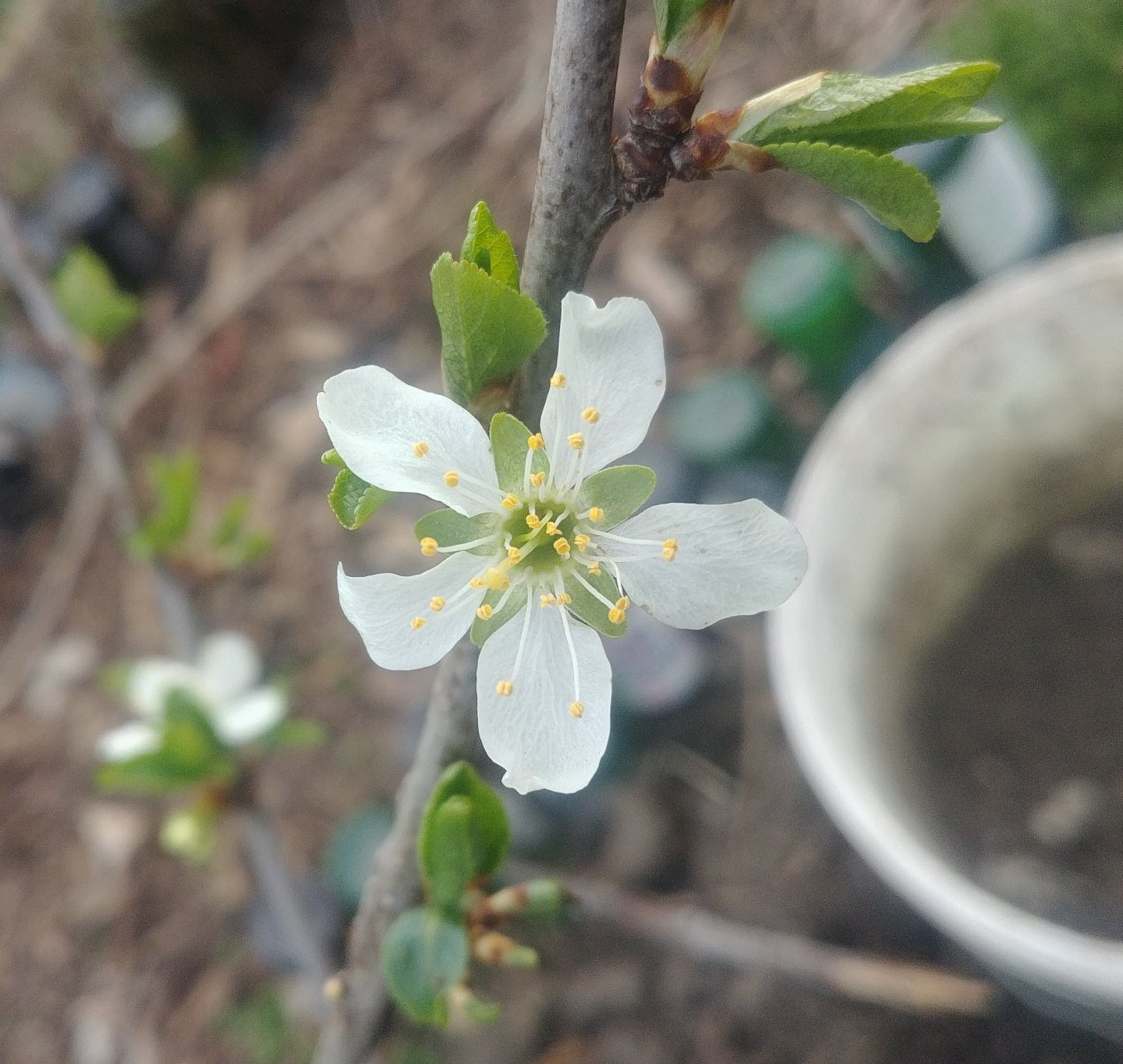
Plum blossom shared on #BlossomWatch, March 2022

#BlossomWatch is a British environmental campaign designed to raise awareness of the first signs of Spring by encouraging people to share images of blossoms via social media. The campaign was begun by the National Trust in 2020, during the COVID-19 pandemic in England.

== Background ==
#BlossomWatch was initiated by the National Trust in March 2020, in the first national lockdown during the COVID-19 pandemic in England. The campaign was inspired by analysis from the Trust's Noticing Nature Report, which discovered that only 6% of children and 7% of adults celebrated natural events such as the arrival of Spring. The campaign also drew on the traditional Japanese custom of hanami, where people communally enjoy the transient nature of cherry blossom.

#BlossomWatch is part of a wider programme of work by the Trust to plant 68 new orchards by 2025, and four million trees with blossom by 2030. In order to understand the extent to which blossom has been lost from the British landscape, artificial intelligence was used to interrogate historic maps of orchards. An interim report from the Trust showed that orchards had reduced in scale from approximately 95,000 hectares in the period 1892–1914, to 41,000 hectares overall in 2022.

== Engagement ==
During the first campaign participants were encouraged to share images on social media of blossoms seen on lockdown walks. Shared images shown during the campaign fortnight were viewed four million times. The campaign was repeated in 2021, when people were encouraged to geotag their blossom locations, in order to crowd-source a map of blossom in the UK.

A third iteration in 2022 saw over 53,000 images shared on social media. It also saw the installation of a 'blossom circle' in Newcastle city centre, which opened on 23 April of that year. It also included the installation of 'pop-up blossom gardens' in Birmingham, at Edgbaston Street and St Philips Cathedral Square. The Trust also announced a scheme to take place in Autumn 2022 to plant blossoming trees along the circular No.11 bus route.
