= Gingival recession =

Exposure in the roots of the teeth

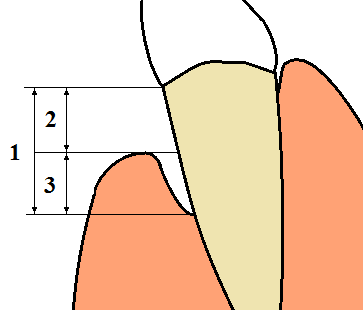
1: Total loss of attachment (clinical attachment loss, CAL) is the sum of 2: Gingival recession, and 3: Probing depth

Gingival recession, also known as gum recession and receding gums, is the exposure in the roots of the teeth caused by a loss of gum tissue or retraction of the gingival margin from the crown of the teeth. Gum recession is a common problem in adults over the age of 40, but it may also occur starting in adolescence, or around the age of 10. It may exist with or without concomitant decrease in crown-to-root ratio (recession of alveolar bone). 85% of the world population has gingival recession on at least one tooth with denuded root surface ≥1.0 mm.

== Classification ==
Various classifications have been proposed to classify gingival recession, Miller's classification system being the one that is most widely followed. Many cases which are encountered in daily clinical practice cannot be classified according to the criteria of the present classification systems. Kumar & Masamatti's classification system gives a comprehensive depiction of recession defect that can be used to include cases that cannot be classified according to present classifications. A separate classification system for palatal recessions (PR) has been given. A new comprehensive classification system classifies recession on the basis of the position of interdental papilla and buccal/lingual/palatal recessions. Kumar & Masamatti's classification system tries to overcome the limitations of Miller's classification.

== Causes ==
There are many possible causes for gingival recession:

- By far the most common cause is gum disease (periodontal disease).
- Overaggressive brushing also causes gum recession. One systemic review of the literature concluded that "The data to support or refute the association between tooth brushing and gingival recession are inconclusive," although aggressive or forceful brushing was not specifically addressed. A subsequent study found horizontal tooth brushing technique (versus Bass technique or circular methods), medium-hardness toothbrush use and brushing only once daily were associated with gingival recession.
- Improper flossing (i.e., flossing too roughly or aggressively) which may cut into the gums.
- Hereditary thin, fragile or insufficient gingival tissue predisposes to gingival recession.
- Dipping tobacco, which affects the mucous membrane lining in the mouth and will cause receding gums over time
- Self-inflicted trauma, such as habits like digging a fingernail or pencil into the gum. This type of recession more commonly associated with children and persons with psychiatric disorders.
- Scurvy (lack of dietary vitamin C)
- Acute necrotizing ulcerative gingivitis
- Abnormal tooth position, such as tooth crowding, giving inadequate cover of one or more teeth by the jaw bone.
- Piercings in the lip or tongue that wear away the gum by rubbing against it.
- Intentional gingival retraction. For example, the adult tooth may not grow out of the gum, and to remedy this, a procedure called an exposure is done. It involves the gum tissue being cut open to allow the adult tooth to grow out. This is a less common cause of gum recession.

== Symptoms ==
Gum recession is generally not an acute condition. In most cases, receding of gums is a progressive condition that occurs gradually over the years. This is one reason that it is common over the age of 40. Because the changes in the condition of the gums from one day to another are minimal, patients get used to the gums' appearance and tend not to notice the recession visually. Receding gums may remain unnoticed until the condition starts to cause symptoms.

Advanced gingival recession. Note particularly severe recession on leftmost incisor.

The following signs and symptoms may indicate gum recession:

- Tooth mobility
- Dentin hypersensitivity (over-sensitive teeth) - short, sharp pain is triggered by hot, cold, sweet, sour, or spicy food and drink. If the cementum covering the root is not protected anymore by the gums, it is easily abraded exposing the dentin tubules to external stimuli.
- Teeth may also appear longer than normal (a larger part of the crown is visible if gums are receding)
- The roots of the tooth are exposed and visible
- The tooth feels notched at the gum line
- Change in the tooth's color (due to the color difference between enamel and cementum)
- Spaces between teeth seem to grow (the space is the same, but it seems larger because the gums do not fill it any more)
- Cavities below the gum line

If the gum recession is caused by gingivitis, the following symptoms may also be present:

- Puffy, red, or swollen (inflamed) gums
- Gum bleeding while brushing or flossing
- Bad breath (halitosis)

In some cases, it is the treatment of gingivitis that reveals a gum recession problem, that was previously masked by the gums swelling.

== Gingival grafting ==
Depending on the shape of the gum recession and the levels of bone around the teeth, areas of gum recession can be regenerated with new gum tissue using a variety of gum grafting "periodontal plastic surgery" procedures performed by a specialist in periodontics (a periodontist). These procedures are typically completed under local anesthesia with or without conscious sedation, as the patient prefers. This may involve repositioning of adjacent gum tissue to cover the recession (called a pedicle graft) or use of a free graft of gingival or connective tissue from the roof of the mouth (called a free gingival graft or a subepithelial connective tissue graft). Alternatively, a material called acellular dermal matrix (processed donated human skin allograft) may be used instead of tissue from the patient's own palate.

=== Growth-factor techniques ===
Recent advances have seen the introduction of platelet-derived growth factor (PDGF) infused bone graft material. This material is usually combined with the cellular matrix to form a soft bone paste that is then covered by the allograft. The development of this type of bone and tissue cellular matrix (also known as ortho filler) results in greater osseointegration with the patient's healthy bone and soft tissue.

Healing from such procedures requires 2–4 weeks. After a few months the results can be evaluated and in some cases the new tissue needs to be reshaped in a very minor procedure to get an optimal result. In cases where recession is not accompanied by periodontal bone loss, complete or near complete coverage of the recession area is achievable.
