= Periodontal diagnosis and classification =

In dentistry, numerous types of classification schemes have been developed to describe the teeth and gum tissue in a way that categorizes various defects. All of these classification schemes combine to provide the periodontal diagnosis of the aforementioned tissues in their various states of health and disease.

== Alveolar ridge deficiency ==
In 1983, Seibert classified alveolar crestal defects:

Class I: buccolingual loss of tissue with normal apicocoronal ridge height

Class II: apicocoronal loss of tissue with normal buccolingual ridge width

Class III: combination-type defects (loss of both height and width)

== Gingival recession ==
The magnitude of a receding gumline, commonly referred to as the measurement of gingival recession, is most often described using Miller's classification:

Class I: Recession that does not extend to the mucogingival junction
Class II: Recession that extends to or beyond the mucogingival junction, but without loss of interproximal clinical attachment
Class III: Recession that extends to or beyond the mucogingival junction, with either loss of interproximal clinical attachment or tooth rotation
Class IV: Recession that extends to or beyond the mucogingival junction, with either loss of interproximal clinical attachment or tooth rotation that is severe

A new classification has been proposed to classify gingival and palatal recessions. The new classification system gives a comprehensive depiction of recession defect that can be used to include cases that cannot be classified according to earlier classifications. A separate classification system for palatal recessions (PR) is also proposed. The new classification system is more detailed, informative and tries to overcome the limitations of Miller's classification system. A wide array of cases which cannot be classified by application of Miller's classification, can be classified by application of Kumar & Masamatti's Classification.

== Tooth mobility ==
As a general rule, mobility is graded clinically by applying firm pressure with either two metal instruments or one metal instrument and a gloved finger.

Normal mobility
Grade I: Slightly more than normal (<0.2mm horizontal movement)
Grade II: Moderately more than normal (1-2mm horizontal movement)
Grade III: Severe mobility (>2mm horizontal or any vertical movement)

Miller Classification
Tooth mobility can also be classified using the Miller Classification:
- Class 1: < 1 mm(Horizontal)
- Class 2: >1 mm(Horizontal)
- Class 3: > 1 mm (Horizontal+vertical mobility)

== Diagnosis of periodontal disease ==
The first step to a successful diagnosis is careful history-taking. Listen carefully to the patient. Ask key questions:

“Do your gums bleed upon brushing?”

“Are any of your teeth loose?”

“Do you smoke?”

"Have you been diagnosed with diabetes?"

Then, using a Williams probe with 1, 2, 3, 5, 7, 8, 9 and 10mm markings, measure the pocket depths around all the teeth. A six-point or a four-point pocket depth charting can be done. It should also be noted if any of the pockets bleed on probing. Bleeding will be a measure of inflammation; no bleeding on probing suggests health, except in smokers, who don't usually bleed on probing.

The probe will also help determine the distance from the base of the gingival sulcus to the cemento-enamel junction; this is attachment loss. This is the best way to monitor the patient's condition long-term but it is sometimes difficult to determine the position of the cemento-enamel junction.

If there is attachment loss, and no other systemic condition, then the diagnosis will be periodontitis.

Using the periodontal six/four point chart, if more than 30% of sites are involved then a diagnosis of generalised disease is given. If less than 30% of sites are involved, then the type of periodontitis is localized.

To complete the diagnosis, the extent of the disease must be assessed. This is defined as: mild (1-2mm), moderate (3-4mm) or severe (≥ 5mm) depending on the amount of attachment loss present.

Radiographs such as bitewings, intra-oral periapicals or a panoramic radiograph can be taken to help assess the bone loss and aid in diagnosis.

== Periodontal classification 2018 ==
Classification of Periodontal Diseases 2018

In 2018, a new classification system for Periodontal diseases was released. It has 3 main parts:

1. Periodontal health, gingival diseases and conditions
2. Periodontitis
3. Other conditions affecting the periodontium.

In periodontal health, gingival diseases and conditions, there are 3 sub-types:

I) Periodontal health and gingival health

1. Gingival health on an intact periodontium
2. Gingival health on a reduced periodontium

i.Stable periodontitis patient
ii.Non periodontitis patient

II) Gingivitis - dental biofilm induced

1. Associated with the dental biofilm alone
2. Mediated by systemic or local risk factors
3. Drug influenced gingival enlargement

III) Gingival diseases - non dental biofilm induced

1. Genetic/developmental disorders
2. Specific infections
3. Inflammatory and immune conditions
4. Reactive processes
5. Neoplasms
6. Endocrine, nutritional and metabolic diseases
7. Traumatic lesions
8. Gingival pigmentation

In the second part of the new classification system, periodontitis, there are again three sub-types:

I) Necrotizing periodontal diseases

II) Periodontitis

III) Periodontitis as a manifestation of systemic disease

In the third division, Other conditions affecting the periodontium, there is again further breakdown.

I) Systemic diseases or conditions affecting the periodontal supporting tissues

II) Periodontal abscesses and endodontic-periodontal lesions

III) Mucogingival deformities and conditions

IV) Traumatic occlusal forces

V) Tooth and prosthesis related factors
