= Free gingival graft =

Dental procedure

The free gingival graft technique, initially introduced by Bjorn in 1963 and subsequently refined by Sullivan and Atkins in 1968, was intended for the treatment of recession defects. The degree of root coverage achieved has been reported to vary between 11% and 100%.The free gingival graft is a simple, predictable technique for increasing the zone of attached gingiva.

Free gingival grafting (FGG) is considered the gold standard technique for predictable augmentation of deficient keratinized mucosa (KM) around natural teeth and dental implants. At the 2017 World Workshop, jointly convened by the American Academy of Periodontology and the European Federation of Periodontology, "keratinized mucosa" was defined as the tissue extending from the peri-implant mucosal margin to the movable lining mucosa.

== Indications and Contraindications ==
=== Indications ===
Free Gingival Graft (FGG) is recommended for patients with inadequate keratinized tissue (KT) of less than 1mm thickness which aims to increase the thickness of KT for long term stability. Patients with discomfort during toothbrushing or chewing due to mucosa trauma are also indicated for FGG. Furthermore, FGG can be used as a pre-conditioning step before further procedures such as pre-orthodontic surgery or pre-prosthetic surgery, by increasing the vestibular depth or stabilize minimal, mobile mucosa. Other indications of FGG can include patients with gingival recession and poor plaque control due to lack of attached gingiva, or when there is progressive recession and the site must be stabilised to reduce the risk of further gingival recession as well as any implant sites which are in need of soft tissue support. FGG is often indicated in the mandibular anterior region for managing gingival recession as this area presents multiple challenges such as high frenal attachment, thin gingival biotype, shallow vestibular depth, etc.

=== Contraindications ===
FGG is considered the gold standard choice for enhancing gingival thickness unless contraindicated in patients with active dental disease, active caries, periodontal or endodontic pathologies or non-restorable teeth. Patent-related contraindications that may compromise treatment outcomes or increase the likelihood of complications include uncontrolled medical conditions like diabetes, cardiovascular diseases, coagulative disorders or immunosuppression, as well as medication that interfere with periodontal healing or excess bleeding. FGG is also not the optimal choice for procedures requiring root coverage, especially in anterior regions where aesthetics can be compromised due to the difference in gingiva colour and texture.

== Surgical Steps ==
1. Preparing the recipient site: Horizontal papillary incisions are placed at right angles to the papilla at the level of the cementoenamel junction (CEJ). Two vertical releasing incisions extend from the gingival margin to the alveolar mucosa, and a split-thickness flap is elevated without disturbing the periosteum. This intact periosteum provides the vascular bed essential for graft survival. The recipient bed is refined to create a stable, immobile surface capable of supporting graft uptake.
2. Harvesting the graft: A free gingival graft is typically harvested from the palate due to its thick keratinized tissue. A template matching the recipient site is used to outline the donor area, ensuring proper dimensions. The graft comprising epithelium and a thin layer of connective tissue is carefully removed and trimmed to fit the intended location.
3. Placement and suturing: The harvested graft is adapted to the recipient bed and sutured at its lateral borders and, when necessary, directly to the periosteum to prevent movement. Digital pressure is applied for several minutes to enhance close contact between the graft and the bed, promoting vascular inosculation and reducing clot space. A periodontal dressing is commonly placed to protect both donor and recipient sites.
4. Postoperative care: Which is critical for successful healing. Dressings are applied to protect the surgical areas, and patients are instructed to avoid brushing the graft region, maintain good oral hygiene elsewhere, and use antimicrobial rinses as prescribed. Dietary modifications, pain control, and monitoring for complications such as bleeding or graft necrosis support optimal healing.

== Advantages ==
=== Relatively high success rate and predictability ===
Success rate is calculated by the mean percentage of root coverage over the total initial recession. FGG was able to achieve a success rate of 73%, which is a moderately satisfactory result among the other modalities such as rotational flaps, coronally advanced flaps, guided tissue regeneration and connective tissue graft with percentages ranging between 68% and 91%.

Predictability, on the other hand, refers to the mean percentage of teeth where total root coverage was successfully established. FGG was able to score a result of 57%, with the aforementioned modalities ranging between 30% and 66%.

The relatively high success rate and predictability of FGG denotes it as a favorable choice for increasing the width of keratinized tissue and halting progression of gingival recession, especially in the lower front teeth area.

=== Treatment convenience ===
FGG is a relatively simple procedure as compared to other modalities such as guided tissue regeneration, as the tissue handling is easier and the length of the procedure is considerably shorter. In addition, FGG can be done for multiple teeth at the same time, which is often required in most cases.

== Disadvantages ==
=== Post-operative complications ===
Multiple complications such as post-operative bleeding, pain and discomfort have been reported in majority of the cases, consequently leading to more research into alternative methods or possible modifications that can be made to the conventional FGG. For instance, a study report has shown that the usage of maxillary tuberosity donor graft instead of the conventional palatal donor graft resulted in less post-operative pain and also improved gingival thickness.

The presence of 2 surgical sites namely the donor site (where the graft was acquired) and the receptor site plays a significant role in contributing to the post-operative discomfort and patient's morbidity. This is mainly due to the risk of hemorrhage and infection of the large wound at the donor site if left untreated.

Graft necrosis and dimensional shrinkage is also a commonly reported complication. Studies have shown a percentage range of 12% to 58%. This significant amount of discrepancy largely depends on the quality of revascularization available. A relationship has been established between an increased number of sutures and reduced revascularization due to the damage imposed on the periosteum in the receptor site. Hence, it is advisable to minimize the number of sutures to diminish the risk of hematomas and subsequently reduce the risk of graft necrosis.

=== Aesthetic concerns ===
FGG may lead to aesthetic concerns due to the unsatisfactory color match between the lighter color of the grafted tissue and the surrounding gingival tissue at the receptor site. As a result, usage of FGG is commonly restricted to non-aesthetic areas. Though, as mentioned above, FGG is a relatively simple procedure, a notable amount of expertise and precision is required to achieve a good aesthetic outcome.

== See also ==
- Gingival grafting
- Subepithelial connective tissue graft
