= Tooth mobility =

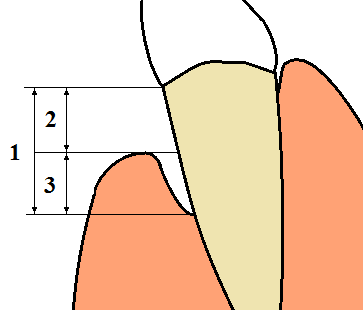
- 1: Total loss of attachment (clinical attachment loss, CAL) is the sum of 2: Gingival recession, and 3: Probing depth (using a periodontal probe)
- Specialty: Dentistry

Tooth mobility is the horizontal or vertical displacement of a tooth beyond its normal physiological boundaries around the gingival (gum) area, i.e. the medical term for a loose tooth.

Tooth loss implies in loss of several orofacial structures, such as bone tissues, nerves, receptors and muscles and consequently, most orofacial functions are diminished. Damage to the supporting tissues of the teeth may progress to necrosis of the alveolar bone, resulting in tooth loss.

== Classification ==
Mobility is graded clinically by applying pressure with the ends of two metal instruments (e.g. dental mirrors) and trying to rock a tooth gently in a bucco-lingual direction (towards the tongue and outwards again). Using the fingers is not reliable as they are too compressible and will not detect small increases in movement. The location of the fulcrum may be of interest in dental trauma. Teeth which are mobile about a fulcrum half way along their root likely have a fractured root.

Normal, physiologic tooth mobility of about 0.25 mm is present in health. This is because the tooth is not fused to the bones of the jaws, but is connected to the sockets by the periodontal ligament. This slight mobility accommodates forces on the teeth during chewing without damaging them. Deciduous teeth also become looser naturally just before their exfoliation. This is caused by gradual resorption of their roots, stimulated by the developing permanent tooth underneath.

Abnormal, pathologic tooth mobility occurs when the attachment of the periodontal ligament to the tooth is reduced (attachment loss, see diagram), or if the periodontal ligament is inflamed. Generally, the degree of mobility is inversely related to the amount of bone and periodontal ligament support left.

Grace & Smales Mobility Index

- Grade 0: No apparent mobility
- Grade 1: Perceptible mobility <1mm in buccolingual direction
- Grade 2: >1mm but <2mm
- Grade 3: >2mm or depressibility in the socket

Miller Classification

- Class 1: < 1 mm (horizontal)
- Class 2: > 1 mm (horizontal)
- Class 3: > 1 mm (horizontal+vertical mobility)

== Causes ==
=== Pathological ===
There are a number of pathological diseases or changes that can result in tooth mobility. These include periodontal disease, periapical pathology, osteonecrosis and malignancies.

==== Periodontal disease ====
Periodontal disease is caused by inflammation of the gums and the supporting tissue due to dental plaque.

Periodontal disease is commonly caused by a build up of plaque on the teeth which contain specific pathological bacteria. They produce an inflammatory response that has a negative effect on the bone and supporting tissues that hold the teeth in place. One of the effects of periodontal disease is that it causes bone resorption and damage to the supportive tissues. This results in a loss of structures to hold the teeth firmly in place and they then become mobile. Treatment for periodontal disease can stop the progressive loss of supportive structures but it can not regrow bone to make teeth stable again.

==== Periapical pathology ====
In cases where periapical pathology is present, teeth also may have increased mobility. Severe infection at the apex of a tooth can again result in bone loss and this in turn can cause mobility. Depending on the extent of damage the mobility may reduce following endodontic treatment. If the mobility is severe or caused by a combination of reasons then mobility may be permanent.

==== Osteonecrosis ====
Osteonecrosis is a condition in which lack of blood supply causes the bone to die off. It mainly presents following radiotherapy to the jaw or as a complication in patients taking specific an angiogenesis inhibitor. As a result of this necrosis the patient might experience several symptoms including tooth mobility.

==== Oral cancer ====
Oral cancer is a malignant abnormal excessive growth of cells within the oral cavity, which arises from premalignant lesions through a multistep carcinogenesis process. Most oral cancers involve the lips, lateral border of the tongue, floor of the mouth, and the area behind the third molars, i.e. the retromolar area. Symptoms of oral cancer can include velvety red patches and white patches, loose teeth with no apparent cause and non-healing mouth ulcers. Risk factors for oral cancer may include caries (cavity) prevalence, oral hygiene status, dental trauma, dental visit, stress, family history of cancer, and body mass index (BMI). Habits such as tobacco chewing/smoking and alcohol are the major causative agents, although human papillomavirus has also recently been implicated as one of them. Alcohol itself is not carcinogenic but it potentiates the effects of carcinogens by increasing the permeability of the oral mucosa.

- By far the most common cause of loss of attachment is periodontal disease (gum disease). This is painless, slowly progressing loss of bony support around teeth. It is made worse by smoking; the treatment is by improving the oral hygiene above and below the gumline.
- Dental abscesses can cause resorption of bone and consequent loss of attachment. Depending on the type of abscess, this loss of attachment may be restored once the abscess is treated, or it may be permanent.
- Many other conditions can cause permanent or temporary loss of attachment and increased tooth mobility. Examples include Langerhans cell histiocytosis.

==== Parafunctional habits ====
Bruxism, which is an abnormal repetitive movement disorder characterised by jaw clenching and tooth grinding, is also a causative factor in the development of dental issues, including tooth mobility. Although it cannot cause periodontium damage in itself, bruxism is known to be able to worsen attachment loss and tooth mobility if periodontal disease is already present. Moreover, the severity of tooth mobility caused by bruxism also varies depending on the teeth grinding pattern and intensity of bruxism. However, the tooth mobility is typically reversible and the tooth returns to normal level of mobility once the bruxism is controlled.

==== Dental trauma ====
Dental trauma refers to any traumatic injuries to the dentition and their supporting structures. Common examples include injury to periodontal tissues and crown fractures, especially to the central incisors. These traumas may also be isolated or associated with other facial trauma. Luxation injury and root fractures of teeth can cause sudden increase in mobility after a blow. However, this depends on the type of dental trauma, as clinical findings show some types of trauma may not affect mobility at all. For example, while a subluxation or alveolar fracture would cause increased mobility, an enamel fracture or enamel-dentin fracture would still show normal mobility.

=== Physiological ===
Physiological tooth mobility is the tooth movement that occurs when a moderate force is applied to a tooth with an intact periodontium.

Causes of tooth mobility other than pathological reasons are listed below:

==== Hormonal ====
Hormones play a vital role in the homeostasis within the periodontal tissues. It has been advocated for a number of years that pregnancy hormones, the oral contraceptive pill and menstruation can alter the host response to invading bacteria, especially within the periodontium, leading to an increase in tooth mobility. This has been presumed to be as a result of the physiological change within the structures surrounding the teeth. In a study conducted by Mishra et al, the link between female sex hormones, particularly in pregnancy, and tooth mobility was confirmed. It was found that the most substantial change in mobility occurred during the final month of gestation.

==== Occlusal trauma ====
Excessive occlusal stresses refer to forces which exceed the limits of tissue adaptation, therefore causing occlusal trauma. Tooth contact may also cause occlusal stress in the following circumstances: parafunction/bruxism, occlusal interferences, dental treatment and periodontal disease. Although occlusal trauma and excessive occlusal forces does not initiate periodontitis or cause loss of connective tissue attachment alone, there are certain cases where occlusal trauma can exacerbate periodontitis. Moreover, pre-existing plaque-induced periodontitis can also cause occlusal trauma to increase the rate of connective tissue loss, which in turn may increase tooth mobility.

==== Primary tooth exfoliation ====
When primary teeth are near exfoliation (shedding of primary teeth) there will inevitably be an increase in mobility. Exfoliation usually occurs between the ages of six and thirteen years. It usually starts with the lower anterior teeth (incisors); however, exfoliation times of the primary dentition can vary. The timing depends on the permanent tooth underneath.

==== Dental treatments ====
A common scenario of dental treatment causing aggravation of tooth mobility is with a new filling or crown which is a fraction of a millimetre too prominent in the bite, which after a few days causes periodontal pain in that tooth and/or the opposing tooth. Orthodontic treatment can cause increased tooth mobility as well. One of the risks of orthodontic treatment, as a result of inadequate access for cleaning, is gingival inflammation. This is most likely to be seen in patients with fixed appliances. Some loss of connective tissue attachment and alveolar bone loss is normal during a two-year course of orthodontic treatment. This does not usually cause problems as it is slight and will resolve after treatment; however, if oral hygiene is inadequate and the patient has a genetic susceptibility to periodontal disease, the effect can be more severe. Another risk of orthodontic treatment that can lead to an increase in mobility is root resorption. The risk of this is thought to be greater if the following factors are present:

- Radiographic evidence of previous root resorption
- Roots of short length prior to orthodontic treatment
- Previous trauma to the tooth
- Iatrogenic: use of excessive forces during orthodontic treatment

== Management ==
The treatment of tooth mobility depends on the aetiology and the grade of mobility. The cause of mobility should be addressed to obtain an optimal treatment outcome. For example, if the tooth mobility is associated with periodontitis, periodontal treatment should be carried out. In the presence of a periapical pathology, treatment options include drainage of abscess, endodontic treatment or extraction.

Occlusal adjustment

Occlusal adjustment is the process of selectively modifying occlusal surfaces of teeth through grinding to eliminate disharmonious occlusion between upper and lower teeth. Occlusal adjustment is only indicated when mobility is associated with periodontal ligament widening. Occlusal adjustments will be unsuccessful if the mobility is caused by other aetiology such as loss of periodontal support or pathology.

Splinting

This is the procedure of increasing resistance of tooth to an applied force by fixing it to a neighbouring tooth or teeth. Splinting should only be done when other aetiologies are addressed, such as periodontal disease or traumatic occlusion, or when treatments are difficult due to the lack of tooth stabilization. Splinting allows healing and functions during tissue healing. The main disadvantage of splinting is it makes removal of plaque more difficult, as there will be increased plaque retention at the margins of the splint, which can cause periodontal disease and further loss of periodontal support. A dental splint works by evening out pressure across a patient's jaw. A splint can be used to protect teeth from further damage as it creates a physical barrier between lower and upper teeth. In order to treat mobility, teeth can be joined or splinted together in order to distribute biting forces between several teeth rather than the individual mobile tooth. A splint differs from a mouthguard as a mouth guard covers both gums and teeth to prevent injury and absorb shock from falls or blows.

=== Types of splints ===
There are various techniques to splint teeth, and they are classified based on several criteria; the material used, location of splinted teeth, flexibility and the longevity of the splint:

A) Material

- Resin by itself
- Resin with flexible arch of nylon or metal wire
- Acid-etched resin-bonded splints
- Orthodontic brackets with malleable arch
- Vestibular arches or bars

B) Flexibility:

- Flexible
- Semi-rigid
- Rigid

The use of each type is based on the level of tooth mobility. In general, non-rigid immobilisation is preferred as it is passive, atraumatic and flexible which allows a certain degree of movement and thus advocates a functional re-arrangement of the periodontal ligament fibres and reduces the risk of external resorption and ankyloses.

However, in terms of a high mobility grade such as when there are cases of bone plate fracture and late replantation, a rigid splint might be needed.

Flexible splints are usually made out of composite resin and nylon thread.

Semi rigid splints are usually made with composite resin and orthodontic wire/nylon thread.

Rigid splints are made with composite and rigid wires or Erinch bars and orthodontic appliances.

The variations in these splints that are made out of similar materials are mainly the diameters of the wires and the weight of the threads; more flexible splints are made of wires that are of lesser diameter while more rigid splints are made of wires with a larger diameter, likewise for the threads. In addition, the wires could also be twisted in a mesh like way to make it more rigid.

The acid-etched resin bonded splint is a relatively new alternative method to protect teeth from further injury by more stabilising them in a favourable occlusal relationship. The main goal in this technique is to replace the missing teeth and provided maximum conservation for the structure of remaining teeth. The acid-etching provides a mechanical retention for the resin.

Splints are classified into three groups according to their longevity and purpose:

1. Temporary

- In general, these are the ones that used less than six months during the periodontal treatment.
- They may or may not require further and different types of splinting.
- Extra-coronal splints which are attached to enamel of several teeth
- Intra-coronal splints which are placed into a small channel within the tooth and bonded or cemented into place

2. Provisional:

- They may be used for a long yet limited time-scale, whether months or several years for diagnostic purposes.
- According to Amsterdam and Fox, this is a phase of restoration therapy using tooth dressing coverage and stabilisation of teeth in combination as an immediate and temporary measure.
- They are used in borderline cases, where dentist cannot predict a certain final outcome for the periodontal treatment during the preliminary treatment-planning.
- They inform the dentist on whether splinting will be beneficial before any comprehensive treatment.
- Such examples are night guards, ligature wires, and composite resin splints.

3. Permanent:

- They are worn indefinitely and may be fixed or removable.
- This is to increase functional stability as well as improving aesthetics for the long-term basis. However, they are often placed only after successful achievement of occlusal stability.
- Loose teeth are crowned and fused or joined together
- Examples of such technique are the pin ledge type of abutment, and the clasped supported partial denture.

Final classification is based on the location of the splinted teeth

1. Extra-coronal splints:

- Are attached to the enamel of several teeth
- Use stabilising wire, fibre-optic ribbon or similar stabilisation devices to bond the outside of the teeth like a fixed orthodontic retainer.
- Further examples include nigh guard and tooth-bonded plastic.

2. Intra-coronal splints:

- The stabilising device is placed into a small chamber within the tooth that are milled by the dentist, and bonded or cemented into place.
- This means the splint is less visible, making it a more aesthetically acceptable option.
- Examples: Inlays, and nylon wires.

=== Management of occlusal trauma associated with periodontal disease ===
Occlusal trauma occurs when excessive force is put on teeth. With periodontal disease there can be irreversible trauma to teeth.

According to Scottish Dental Clinical Effectiveness Programme (SDCEP) guidelines, when teeth have either over-erupted or drifted due to periodontal disease, it is recommended to check for fremitus or occlusal interference:

1. Fremitus test

Allows the diagnosis of trauma caused by patient's occlusal forces. The index finger is placed on to the buccal/labial surface of the maxillary teeth. Once in maximum intercuspal position, the patient is asked to make lateral and protrusive movements with their jaw. The vibration of the tooth is felt when it is in the maximum intercuspal position.

The vibrations are graded as follows:

Grade I: slight movement (+)

Grade II: Palpable movement (++)

Grade III: Movement visible with naked eye (+++)

2. Occlusal interference

When a tooth occludes in an undesirable contact point, it prevents other teeth from achieving the ideal and harmonious contact points.

There are four types of occlusal interference:

1. Centric

2. Working

3. Non-working

4. Protrusive

Occlusal interference can be managed by removing the premature contact point or through restorative materials.
