= Hesam =

Hesam or Hessam may refer to:

== People ==
- Hessam Abrishami (born 1951), Iranian-American artist
- Hesam Fetrati (born 1981), Iranian artist
- Hesam Manzour (born 1980), Iranian actor
- Hessam Nowzari, American dentistry academic
- Salman Hesam (born 1947), Iranian Olympic athlete

== Geography ==
- Mir Hesam, a village in Kurdistan Province, Iran
- Mirza Hesam, a village in West Azerbaijan Province, Iran

== Other ==
- HESAM University Group, a group of French educational institutions
