= Abrishami =

Abrishami may refer to:

- Abrishami Synagogue, synagogue in Tehran, Iran
- Hessam Abrishami (born 1951), Iranian artist
