= Jørgen Slots =

Danish periodontist

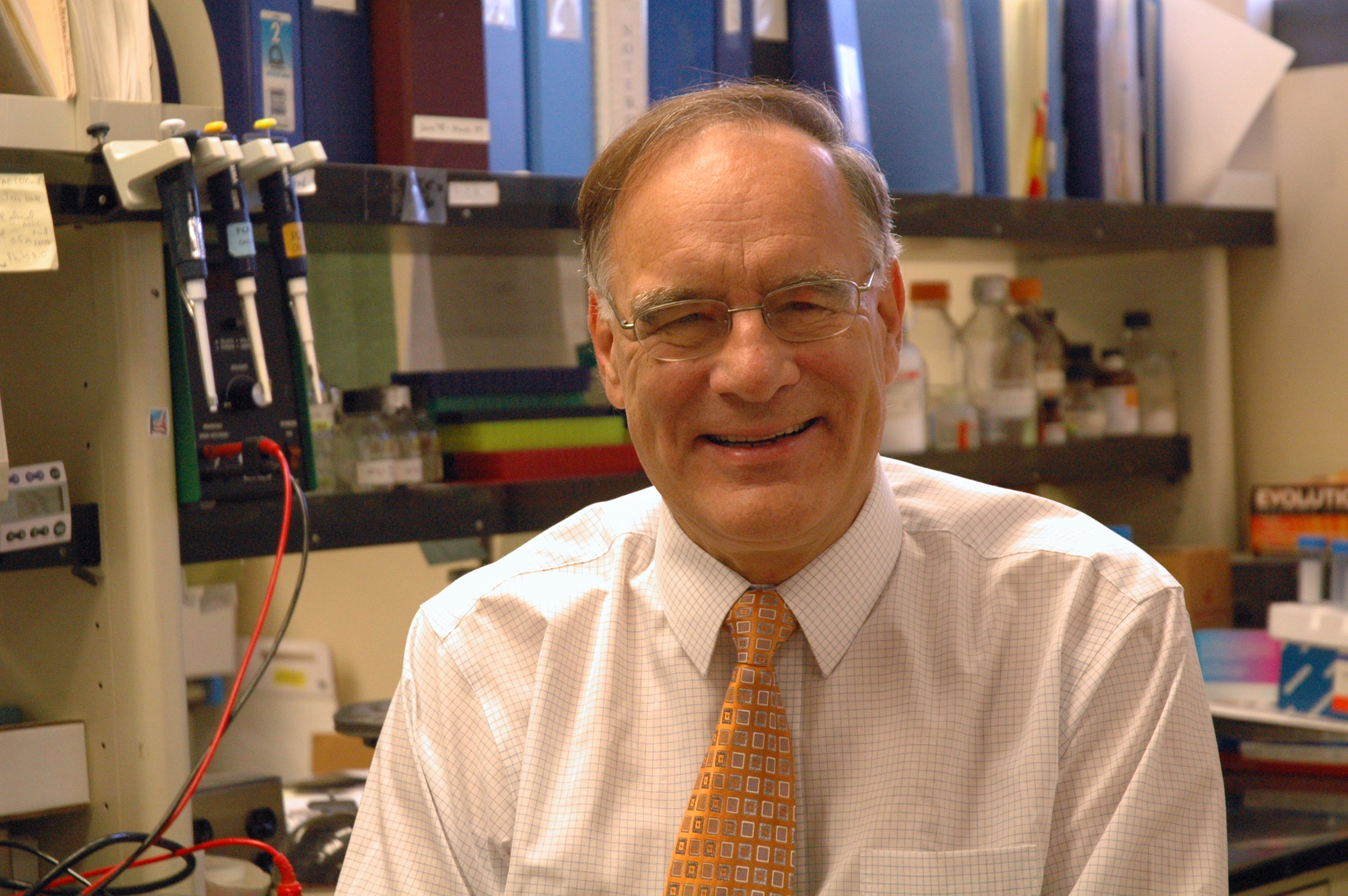
- Professor Jørgen Slots
- Title: Professor of periodontology and microbiology, Herman Ostrow School of Dentistry of USC; former chairman of department of periodontology
- Website: profiles.sc-ctsi.org/jorgen.slots

Jørgen Slots is a Danish periodontist notable for his contributions to the field of periodontology. He is professor of periodontology and microbiology at the Herman Ostrow School of Dentistry of USC, and was chairman of periodontology from 1991 to 2001.

== Education ==
Slots graduated from the Royal Dental College of Copenhagen, Denmark in 1969 and received his postgraduate certificate in periodontology in 1976. In 1977, he received a certificate in microbiology from the Forsyth Institute in Boston, Massachusetts. To fulfill United States licensing requirements, he redid his dental training at an American Dental Association-accredited dental school, graduating from University of Pennsylvania School of Dental Medicine in 1987, along with an MBA received in 1989 from the same institution.

== Career ==
Slots is a professor in the department of periodontology at the Herman Ostrow School of Dentistry of USC. He is editor-in-chief of Periodontology 2000 and editor-in-chief emeritus of the Journal of Periodontal Research, as well as the author of numerous articles related primarily to the use of antimicrobials and antibiotics in the treatment of periodontal disease. He advocates the use of diluted bleach as both a mouth rinse and a subgingival (under the gum line) irrigant in a clinical setting as an adjunctive treatment for periodontal diseases.

Slots has been awarded the 1990 William J. Gies Award by the American Academy of Periodontology for outstanding contribution to the field of periodontology and a 1995 award from the California Society of Periodontists for his outstanding contribution to the specialty of periodontists and personal commitment to the highest professional standards of dentistry. He was also honored at the 2013 American Academy of Periodontology annual meeting for his past and continued contributions to the field.

Slots co-authored the textbook Contemporary Oral Microbiology and Immunology in 1992 with Martin Taubman and Samuel Yankell.

== Aggregatibacter actinomycetemcomitans ==
Slots discovered the role of Aggregatibacter actinomycetemcomitans (previously Actinobacillus actinomycetemcomitans) in aggressive periodontitis, previously known as juvenile periodontitis. In 1982, Slots developed tryptic soy-serum-bacitracin-vancomycin (TSBV), a type of agar plate medium to select for this bacteria. It was Slots' work, along with that of Newman, Socransky and others, that substantiated aggressive periodontitis as a bona fide infection, rather than merely a degenerative disorder.
