= DTDP-6-deoxy-L-talose 4-dehydrogenase (NAD+) =

DTDP-6-deoxy-L-talose 4-dehydrogenase (NAD^{+})

Identifiers
- EC no.: 1.1.1.339

Databases
- IntEnz: IntEnz view
- BRENDA: BRENDA entry
- ExPASy: NiceZyme view
- KEGG: KEGG entry
- MetaCyc: metabolic pathway
- PRIAM: profile
- PDB structures: RCSB PDB PDBe PDBsum
Search
- PMC: articles
- PubMed: articles
- NCBI: proteins

DTDP-6-deoxy-L-talose 4-dehydrogenase (NAD^{+}) (EC 1.1.1.339, tll (gene name)) is an enzyme with systematic name dTDP-6-deoxy-beta-L-talose:NAD^{+} 4-oxidoreductase. This enzyme catalyses the following chemical reaction

dTDP-6-deoxy-beta-L-talose + NAD^{+} $\rightleftharpoons$ dTDP-4-dehydro-6-deoxy-beta-L-mannose + NADH + H^{+}

The enzyme from bacterium Aggregatibacter actinomycetemcomitans participates in the biosynthesis of the serotype c-specific polysaccharide antigen.
