= Tryptic soy-serum-bacitracin-vancomycin =

Agar plate medium used in microbiology

Tryptic soy-serum-bacitracin-vancomycin (TSBV) is a type of agar plate medium used in microbiological testing to select for Aggregatibacter actinomycetemcomitans (A. a.). It was described by Jørgen Slots in 1982, who also discovered the role of A.a. in periodontitis.

Per litre, TSBV contains:

- 40 g tryptic soy agar
- 1 g yeast extract
- 100 mL horse serum
- 75 mg bacitracin
- 5 mg vancomycin
