= USC Herman Ostrow School of Dentistry =

Dental school of the University of Southern California

Coordinates: 34.024138°N 118.286341°W

- Type: Private dental school
- Established: 1897
- Dean: Dr. Yang Chai, DDS, PhD.
- Academic staff: 726
- Undergraduates: 122
- Postgraduates: 388
- Doctoral students: 999
- Location: Los Angeles, California, United States
- Website: dentistry.usc.edu

The USC Herman Ostrow School of Dentistry is the dental school of the University of Southern California. It was established in 1897 as simply the "University of Southern California School of Dentistry" as the first established dental school in Southern California. The school graduated its first class of 11 students in 1900.

Herman Ostrow's DDS class of 2027 has a 58% female to 42% male ratio, a 3.78 average GPA (3.72 science GPA) and a 20.7 DAT academic average.

== Namesake ==
In 2010, the school was rebranded after a $35 million donation by a USC alumnus, and the school was renamed for its benefactor, Herman Ostrow. Dr. Ostrow was a School of Dentistry of USC alumnus who graduated in 1945. He practiced within the profession of dentistry for 17 years before getting into real estate development in the Los Angeles area, where he made most of his earnings.

== Programs ==
On top of the DDS (Doctor of Dental Surgery) program, the Herman Ostrow School of Dentistry offers a PhD program in Craniofacial Biology, MS in Biomaterials and Digital Dentistry, MS in Biomedical Implants and Tissue Engineering.

The school also offer online dental master's degrees and certificate programs in Orofacial Pain and Oral Medicine, Oral Pathology and Radiology, Geriatric Dentistry, Community Oral Health, and a Pain Medicine program in partnership with the Keck School of Medicine of USC.

== Didactic and Clinical Education ==
Herman Ostrow implements a PBL (Problem-Based Learning) curriculum in their DDS program, where groups of student dentists participate in discussions of case studies in lieu of traditional lectures.

The learner-centered doctoral program combines basic science and clinical content over four years:

1. Assess dental patients and deliver excellent care

2. Develop effective communication skills

3. Work effectively with colleagues

4. Become a lifelong, self-motivated learner

5. Contribute to innovation and advances in dental science

First-year DDS students at Ostrow benefit from significant preclinical experience, education and training in restorative dentistry using simulators, for a seamless transition to direct patient care by the end of year one. DDS students collectively serve about 12,000 patients in the school's faculty-supervised, student-run oral health clinics.

== Community Outreach ==
Ostrow students, with faculty supervision, provide free dental care to more than 17,500 low-income individuals each year through our Mobile Dental Clinic program and numerous local clinics and community events.

== Alumni ==
- Reed Holdaway, 1946
- Ben L. Salomon, 1937
- Vada Somerville, 1912
- John Alexander Somerville, 1907

== Faculty ==
- Stanley Malamed
- Jørgen Slots
