= Reed Holdaway =

American orthodontist (1917–2009)

Reed Holdaway (June 7, 1917 – February 28, 2009) was an American orthodontist who is known for developing the Holdaway soft tissue analysis. He was past president of the American Board of Orthodontists and Rocky Mountain Association of Orthodontists.

== Life ==
He was born on June 7, 1917, in Vineyard, Utah. His parents were Elmer and Mary Ellen Holdaway. He then went to primary school in the same town and attended Lincoln High School in Orem, Utah. He attended the University of Utah for his college degree and then went to the University of Southern California Dental College in 1936 to obtain his dental degree. Holdaway eventually became interested in orthodontics and studied with Roscoe Keedy of Grand Junction, Colorado. He was a former instructor at the annual Tweed course and taught many short courses at the universities of Washington, Texas, and California. Holdaway married his wife Margaret on August 8, 1938, in the Salt Lake Temple. They were married for 71 years.

He died on February 28, 2009, at age 91. He is survived by 6 of his children, as well as 28 grandchildren and 49 great-grandchildren.

== Orthodontics ==
Holdaway was known for his contributions to the field of Orthodontics. He developed the holdaway lip analysis. The lip analysis, which was called H Line, was known to run from the cephalometric point Soft Tissue Pogonion to the upper lip. The "H" angle of Holdaway was between the Nasion-B Point (NB) line and the H line. For a normal ANB value of 2-3 degrees, H angle is around 7-8 degrees.

He was also known for developing the Holdaway ratio to compare the prominence of the lower incisors compare to that of the bony chin. According to him, the distance from labial surface of the mandibular incisor to the N-B line and the distance from the Pogonion to N-B line should be equal.

== Awards and recognition ==
- Albert H. Ketcham Award - 1981
- Merit award by Orthodontic Education and Research Foundation - 1972
- Rocky Mountain Association of Orthodontists - President
- American Board of Orthodontics - President
