= Dunbar Hotel =

- Somerville Hotel
- U.S. National Register of Historic Places
- Los Angeles Historic-Cultural Monument
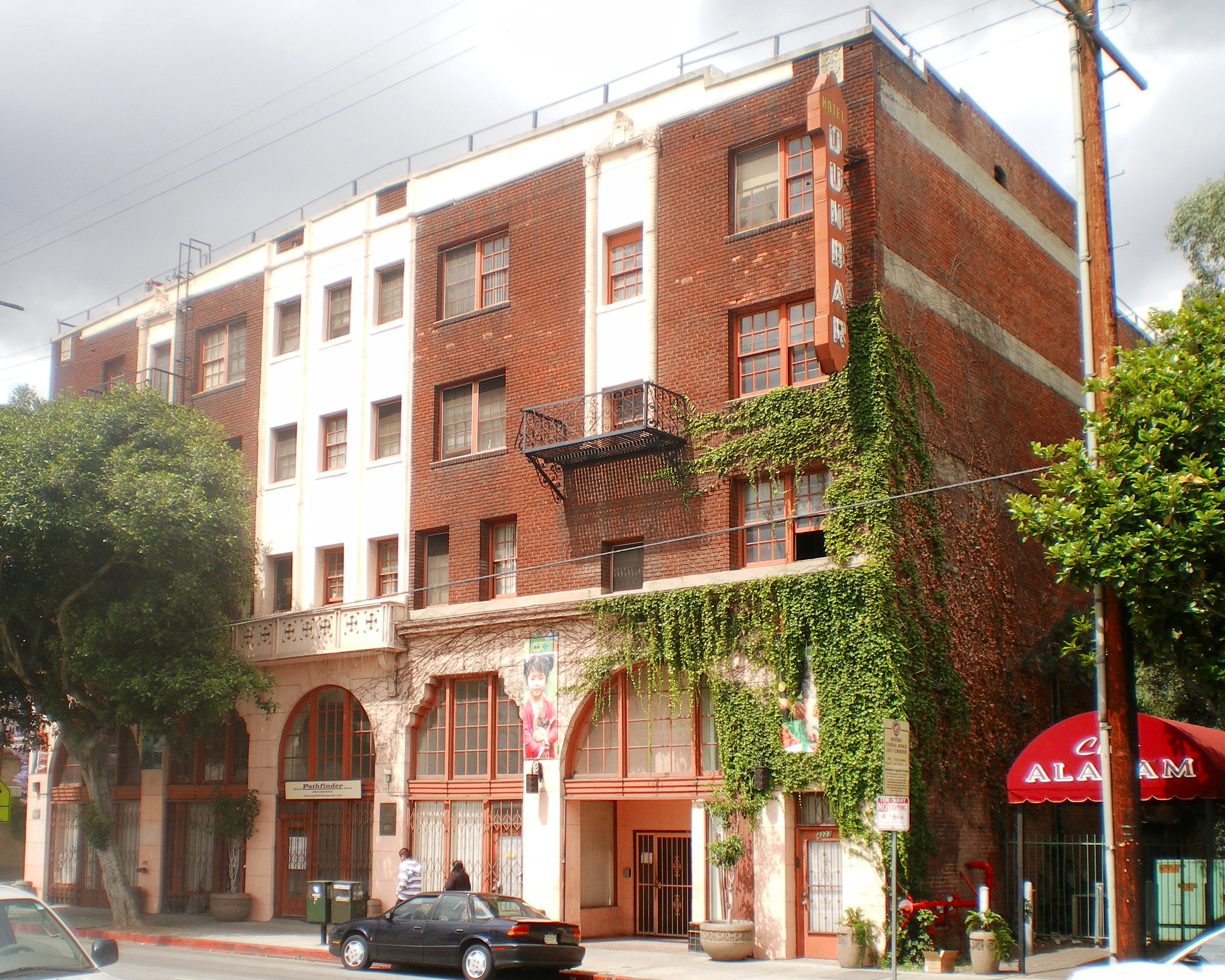
- Dunbar Hotel, 2008

- Location within the Los Angeles metropolitan area Location within California Location within the United States
- Location: 4225 S. Central Ave., Los Angeles, California
- Coordinates: 34°0′25″N 118°15′21″W
- Built: 1928
- Architectural style: Mission/Spanish Revival
- NRHP reference No.: 76000491
- LAHCM No.: 131

Significant dates
- Added to NRHP: January 17, 1976
- Designated LAHCM: September 4, 1974

The Dunbar Hotel, originally known as the Hotel Somerville, was the focal point of the Central Avenue African-American community in Los Angeles, California, during the 1930s and 1940s. Built in 1928 by John Alexander Somerville, it was known for its first year as the Hotel Somerville. Upon its opening, it hosted the first national convention of the National Association for the Advancement of Colored People (NAACP) to be held in the western United States. In 1930, the hotel was renamed the Dunbar, and it became the most prestigious hotel in LA's African-American community. In the early 1930s, a nightclub opened at the Dunbar, and it became the center of the Central Avenue jazz scene in the 1930s and 1940s. The Dunbar hosted Duke Ellington, Cab Calloway, Billie Holiday, Louis Armstrong, Lionel Hampton, Count Basie, Lena Horne, and many other jazz legends. Other noteworthy people who stayed at the Dunbar include W. E. B. Du Bois, Joe Louis, Ray Charles, and Thurgood Marshall. Former heavyweight champion Jack Johnson also ran a nightclub at the Dunbar in the 1930s.

No longer a hotel, the building was renovated in the 2010s and is now part of a larger residential community named Dunbar Village.

== Hotel Somerville opens in 1928 ==
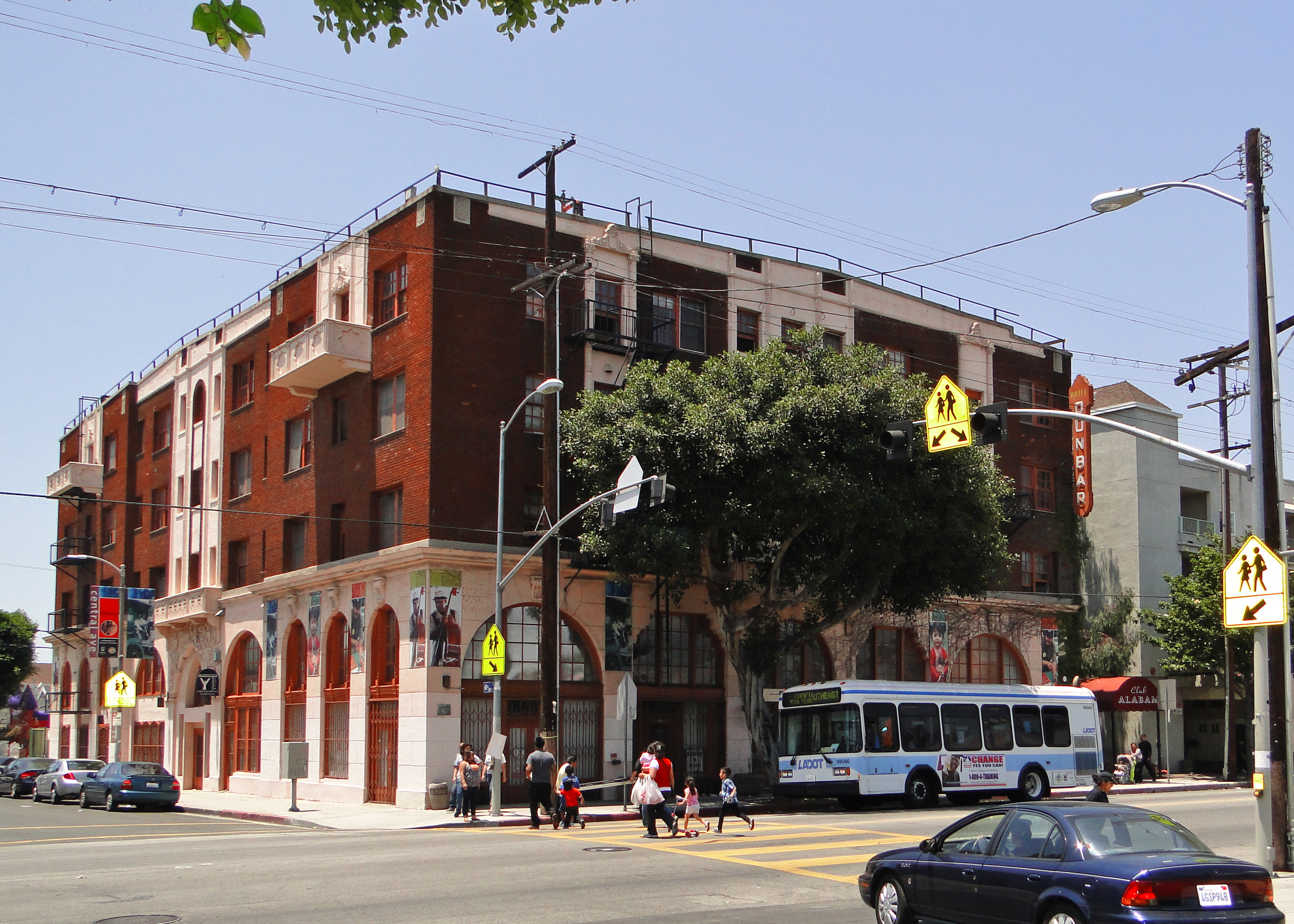
Originally known as Hotel Somerville, the Central Avenue landmark was a source of pride in the African American community when it opened in 1928.

The hotel was built in 1928 by John and Vada Somerville, socially and politically prominent black Angelenos. Vada Somerville was the first African-American woman in California to receive a Doctor of Dental Surgery degree at University of Southern California. John Alexander Somerville was the first black person to graduate from the University of Southern California. The hotel was built entirely by black contractors, laborers, and craftsmen and financed by black community members.

For many years, the Somerville was the only major hotel in Los Angeles that welcomed blacks, and it quickly became the place to stay for visiting black dignitaries. In 1928, the Somerville housed delegates to the first NAACP convention held in the western United States. In 1929, when Oscar De Priest (the first African American to serve in Congress in the 20th century) visited Los Angeles, he was met at the station "by a large delegation of colored people, who formed a parade and escorted him to the Dunbar Hotel."

The hotel was known for its physical amenities. Its Art Deco lobby had a spectacular chandelier (also in the Art Deco style), Spanish arcade-like windows, tiled walls and a flagstone floor. The lobby was said to look like "a regal Spanish arcade, with open balconies and steel grillwork, as opulent as the Granada Building at Lafayette Park." One person who was present at the hotel's groundbreaking ceremony recalled it was "a palace compared to what we had been used to."

The hotel came to represent a level of achievement among the black community. Historian Lonnie G. Bunch III said, "On the one hand, blacks were not allowed to stay at major hotels. But with enough financial wherewithal and a strong sense of community a black man could build a large hotel." Unlike earlier segregated hotels and boarding houses, the Somerville (and later the Dunbar) offered luxury amenities – a restaurant, cocktail lounge and barbershop. One person noted, "The Dunbar symbolizes luxury and respect even in the worst of times." Roy Wilkins wrote in the New York Amsterdam News of the hotel's luxury and service: "Everything was just the opposite of what we had come to expect in 'Negro' hotels."

The Somerville/Dunbar also played an important role in anchoring the new Central Avenue community. Prior to 1928, the black community in Los Angeles had been centered around 12th Street and Central Avenue, near Downtown Los Angeles. Somerville was the first to build a major structure so far south in the 42nd Street neighborhood, and soon other businesses followed.

After the stock market crash in 1929, Somerville was forced to sell the hotel to a syndicate of white investors. The passing of the hotel from its original black ownership was a disappointment for a community that viewed the hotel as a symbol of black achievement. The hotel was renamed the Dunbar in 1929, in honor of poet Paul Laurence Dunbar.

In 1930, the hotel was purchased for $100,000 by Lucius W. Lomax, Sr. (1879-1961). With ownership being restored to an African-American, the "debilitating impact of John Somerville's loss was reversed, and the hotel once again became the gem of black Los Angeles."

During Somerville's ownership, there was no nightclub or live music at the hotel. It was not until February 1931 that the Dunbar was issued a permit "to conduct a cabaret in the dining room." Though he had sold the hotel, Somerville and others in the neighborhood opposed the establishment of a cabaret in his hotel, stating that such a use "would cast a lasting stigma on it."

== Hub of the Central Avenue scene ==
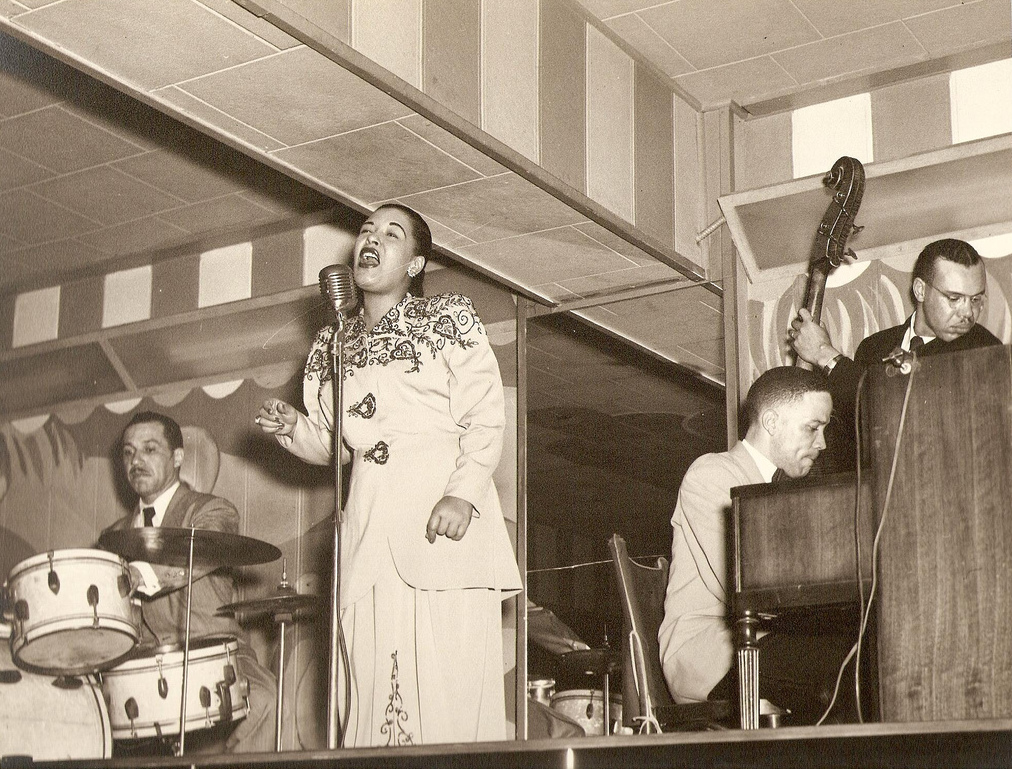
Billie Holiday and other African American performers stayed at the Dunbar when working in LA.

The Dunbar became known in the 1930s and 1940s as "the hub of Los Angeles black culture," and "the heart of Saturday night Los Angeles." In its heyday, it was known as "a West Coast mixture of the Waldorf-Astoria and the Cotton Club." The Los Angeles Herald-Examiner described the Dunbar this way:

It was once the most glorious place on 'the Avenue.' At the Dunbar Hotel ... you could dance to the sounds of Cab Calloway, laugh till your stomach hurt with Redd Foxx and maybe, just maybe, get a room near Billie Holiday or Duke Ellington.

The Dunbar hosted prominent African Americans traveling to Los Angeles, including Duke Ellington, Joe Louis, Louis Armstrong, Lena Horne, Paul Robeson, Marian Anderson, and Josephine Baker. The Dunbar was "the gathering spot for the crème de la crème of black society, the hotel for performers who could entertain in white hotels but not sleep in them." In 1940, radio comedian Eddie "Rochester" Anderson used the Dunbar as his headquarters while "campaigning" for the honorary seat of "Mayor of Central Avenue."

The Dunbar also became the place where African American political and intellectual leaders and writers, including Langston Hughes, W. E. B. Du Bois, Ralph Bunche, Thurgood Marshall and James Weldon Johnson, gathered. It has been described as "a place where the future of black America was discussed every night of the week in the lobby." Celes King III, whose family owned the Dunbar in its heyday, said, "They were very serious discussions between people like W. E. B. Du Bois (founder of the NAACP), doctors, lawyers, educators and other professionals. This was the place where many of them put together the plans to improve the life style of their people."

One of the regulars at the Dunbar in its heyday was future mayor Tom Bradley, then a young police officer. Bradley would stop in for coffee and conversation. Bradley later recalled, "I remember, from the days of my childhood, walking down the avenue, just to get a look at some of those famous superstars."

More than anything, the Dunbar is remembered for its role in the Central Avenue jazz scene. The nightclub at the Dunbar was the home-away-from-home for, and the stage for performances by, artists including Duke Ellington, Louis Armstrong, Louis Jordan, Count Basie, Lionel Hampton, Lena Horne, Ella Fitzgerald, Billie Holiday, Cab Calloway, and Nat King Cole. Even Ray Charles stayed at the Dunbar when he first moved to Los Angeles.

In addition to the main nightclub, former heavyweight champion Jack Johnson opened his Showboat nightclub at the Dunbar in the 1930s. "Jack Johnson ... ran his Showboat nightclub in one corner, and black bands practiced on the mezzanine for acts across town later that night."

The hotel was also popular with the white community, and many from Hollywood spent their Saturday nights at the Dunbar and surrounding clubs. Celes King recalled once when Bing Crosby bounced a check at the hotel, and her father (the hotel's owner) kept Crosby's check. "It was a big joke between them."

The neighborhood was also the home of other famous jazz clubs, including Club Alabam (next door), the Last Word (across the street), and the Downbeat (nearby). Even local musicians who were playing at other Central Avenue clubs would gather at the Dunbar. Lee Young, the drummer who led a band at the Club Alabam, recalled: "The fellows in the band – Charles Mingus, Art Pepper, all of us – would hang out between sets next door at the Dunbar ... Between the club and the hotel you'd see movie stars and all the big show business names of the day."

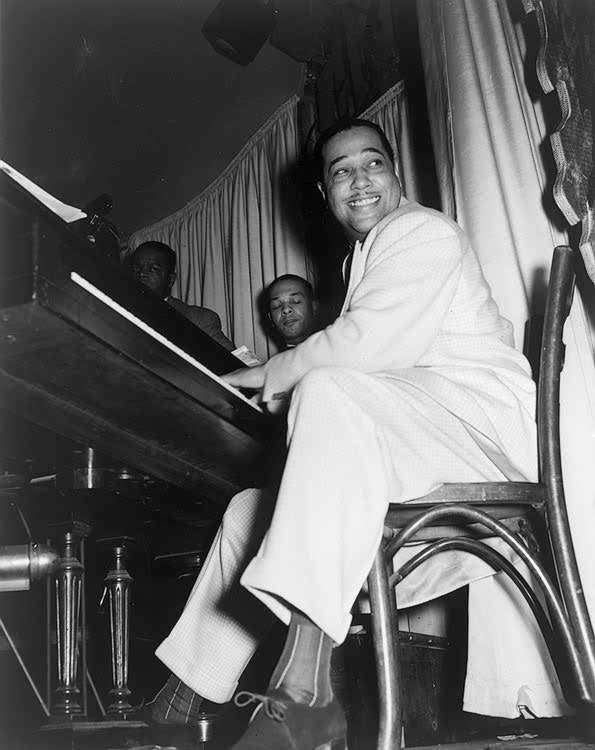
Buck Clayton wrote that Duke Ellington threw parties at the Dunbar with "chicks and champagne everywhere."

Musician Jack Kelson recalled the sidewalk in front of the Dunbar as the most desirable place to hang out on the city's coolest street. He said, "That's my favorite spot on Central Avenue, that spot in the front of the Dunbar Hotel, because that to me was the hippest, most intimate, key spot of all the activity. That's where all the night people hung out: the sportsmen, the businessmen, the dancers, everybody in show business, people who were somebody stayed at the hotel. ... [B]y far that block, that Dunbar Hotel, for me was it. And it was it for, it seemed to me, everybody else. Sooner or later you walked in front of that hotel, and that's where everybody congregated."

Another writer recalled the area around the Dunbar as "a place where people love to congregate and have a good time, check out the new models and pick up on the latest lingo." The Dunbar built a reputation in the 1930s as "the symbol of L.A.'s black nightlife," as "regular jamming sessions and meetings in the hotel lobby elevated the structure to a practically mythical status." Lionel Hampton had fond memories of jam sessions and practices on the Dunbar's mezzanine. Hampton recalled, "Everybody that was anybody showed up at the Dunbar. I remember a chauffeur would drive Stepin Fetchit, the movie star, up to the curb in a big Packard, and he'd look out the window at all the folks."

In his autobiography, Buck Clayton shared some of his memories of the Dunbar. He recalled the Dunbar as "jumping" with loads of people trying to get a glimpse of the celebrities, and parties thrown by Duke Ellington and his guys with "chicks and champagne everywhere." Clayton recalled an instance when Ellington and his orchestra came to Los Angeles shortly after the 1932 release of the song It Don't Mean a Thing (If It Ain't Got That Swing). Ellington's band was in the Dunbar restaurant when the song came on the jukebox. It was the first time since leaving New York that they had heard their recording. Clayton described the band's response: "So much rhythm I've never heard, as guys were beating on the tables, instrument cases or anything else they could beat on with knives, forks, rolled-up newspapers or anything else they could find to make rhythm. It was absolutely crazy."

The Dunbar was also known for its food. One musician recalled they "had good old southern-fried everything."

== The Peace Mission years ==
For a brief period during the Great Depression, the Dunbar was converted into a hostel for members of the Peace Mission Movement of Father Divine. In 1934, Lucius Lomax sold the hotel to the Peace Mission. The hotel staff was discharged, and the building was renovated as lodging for the mission's members. The Peace Mission Movement, run by Father Divine, operated a multi-racial religious colony at the Dunbar, with members using the dining room (formerly the site of a cabaret) for Holy Communion ceremonies. The Dunbar was sold to the Nelson family in the late 1930s, and it resumed its role as the cultural center of the Los Angeles black community.

== Deterioration and redevelopment ==
Just as racial segregation had created a need for the Dunbar, racial integration in the 1950s eliminated the need. Duke Ellington, who had previously kept a suite at the Dunbar, began staying at the Chateau Marmont in Hollywood, and others followed. As one writer put it: "When the barriers against integration began to crumble in the late 1950s, so did the Dunbar Hotel."

Bernard Johnson bought the Dunbar in 1968, but the hotel continued to lose money, and Johnson closed the hotel's doors in 1974. While closed in 1974, comedian Rudy Ray Moore used the hotel extensively in his low-budget film Dolemite, and in 1976, the movie A Hero Ain't Nothin' but a Sandwich was filmed at the Dunbar. Owner Bernard Johnson also opened a museum of black culture for a time. But for most of the years from 1974 to 1987, the building was vacant and declined drastically, as transients began using it for shelter, and the building suffered from graffiti, broken windows and litter.

A renovation effort was started in 1979, but stopped when city funding ceased. By 1987, the Dunbar was marred by graffiti and generally tarnished by neglect. That year, a plan was announced to convert the Dunbar into low-income housing units with a museum of black culture on the ground floor. The 115 hotel rooms on the top three floors were gutted and replaced with 72 apartments. The mezzanine, lobby and basement retained their original décor and were converted into a museum and cultural center. The project was funded in large part with city redevelopment funds at a cost of $4.2 million.

In 1990, the Dunbar re-opened as a 73-unit apartment building for low-income senior citizens and museum of black history. Delegates from the NAACP national convention helped rededicate the Dunbar in July 1990 following its renovation. Los Angeles Mayor Tom Bradley attended the rededication ceremony and praised the efforts to "breathe new life and vigor into this magnificent hotel."

The Dunbar hosted a jazz show in 1991, attended by noted music journalist Leonard Feather. Feather wrote that the event was like "a visit to a haunted house." When one of the musicians played a Duke Ellington theme, Feather said "you could look up at the balcony and see, in your mind's eye, Duke himself at a piano on the mezzanine, working out an arrangement for tomorrow's show."

By 1997, the neighborhood around the Dunbar was 75% Latino, and by 2006 the neighborhood was predominantly Latino and poor, with most of the nearby storefronts having their signs written in Spanish.

== Designation as historic site ==
In 1974, the Dunbar was designated as an Historic-Cultural Landmark (no. 131) by the city's Cultural Heritage Commission. The plaque called the hotel "an edifice dedicated to the memory and dignity of black achievement." It was also added to the National Register of Historic Places in 1976. The Dunbar was also listed in the Green Book, a guide to African American travelers, from 1940-1956. This map pin shows the location.

== Extensive renovation ==
The Dunbar was in such disrepair pigeons and rats were living in the vacated apartments and drug dealing was prevalent in the area some time after that.

After the city foreclosed on the property, in partnership with Coalition for Responsible Community Development was selected through a competitive bidding process to redevelop the Dunbar Hotel.

In approximately 2005 Blues entertainer Roy Gaines performed at the annual Jazz Festival and along with Deborah Dixon of the Southern California Blues Society they were interviewed and photographed in the hotel by the Los Angeles Times. It had been refurbished and was being occupied by then.

In 2011, Dunbar Village L.P. was formed and purchased the buildings. The project included transforming the three existing buildings, the Dunbar Hotel, Somerville I and Somerville II, into one cohesive, activated, mixed-use, intergenerational community that honors South Los Angeles and the historic Dunbar Hotel.The new community is called Dunbar Village.

Along with the physical renovation of the property was the community transformation. The first step in this transformation was securing the building from the gangs and drug dealers. The new owner installed a state-of-the-art camera system to help deter the rampant criminal activity occurring in the buildings. In a short time, this along with other security measures, helped to eliminate the frequent police visits to the property. Dunbar went from being one of the most visited properties by the police to a safe and secure community.

Preserving Dunbar Hotel's historic brick facade, grand entry and lobby, the new design provides 41 residential units of affordable housing for seniors with amenities that include a community room, communal kitchen, media lounge, billiard table, library area and fitness room.

In 2013, Councilwoman Jan Perry with many others attended the re-opening ceremony.

"Central Avenue and the Dunbar Hotel have long been an important part of our Los Angeles history. It is wonderful to see the Avenue come alive again and know that this historic landmark will be restored for people to enjoy for generations to come," said Councilwoman Perry, who led efforts to ensure that the Dunbar Hotel was redeveloped as part of an overall plan to revitalize the Central Avenue community. "Dunbar Village will preserve our shared history, create quality jobs for local youth, and offer much-needed affordable housing for families and seniors."

Together, Dunbar Village will have 83 units, including 41 senior units in the Dunbar Hotel and 42 affordable family units.

== See also ==
- List of Los Angeles Historic-Cultural Monuments in South Los Angeles
- List of Registered Historic Places in Los Angeles
- Black and tan clubs
