= John Alexander Somerville =

African American Civil rights activist, dentist and entrepreneur

Dr. John Alexander Somerville CBE
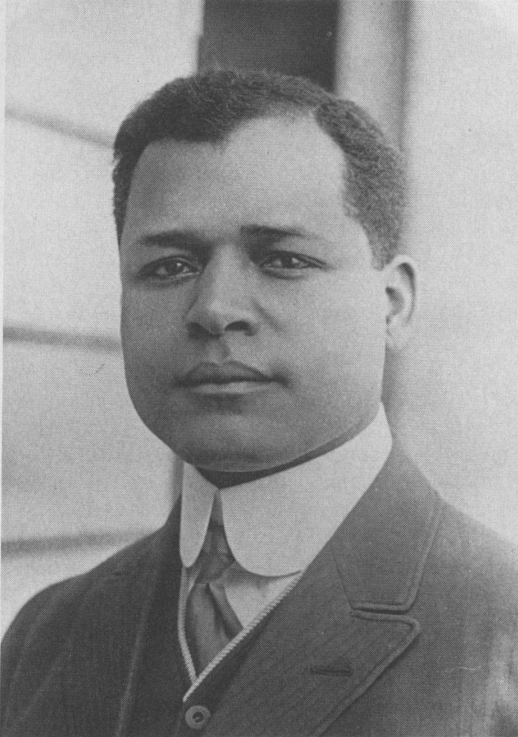
- Born: 1882; Jamaica
- Died: February 11, 1973 (aged 91); Los Angeles, California, United States
- Citizenship: United States, Jamaica
- Education: Doctor of dental surgery, Herman Ostrow School of Dentistry of USC, graduated 1907
- Alma mater: University of Southern California
- Occupation: Dentist
- Organization: National Association for the Advancement of Colored People
- Political party: Democratic Party
- Spouse: Vada Watson Somerville (m. 1912)

John Alexander Somerville, D.D.S. (1882 – February 11, 1972) was an African American Civil rights activist, dentist, and entrepreneur. A well-known community figure in Los Angeles, Somerville was an accomplished dentist who went on to co-found the Los Angeles branch of the National Association for the Advancement of Colored People. He is most well known for building Hotel Somerville, now known as Dunbar Hotel.

== Early life and education ==
John Alexander Somerville was born in Jamaica in 1882 to Thomas G. Somerville and Frances A. Somerville née Cowell. Thomas was a principal and Anglican minister, while Frances taught at the Anglican school that Thomas administered. Somerville completed his pre-college education in Jamaica, but he failed an exam for a university scholarship. Rather than re-take the exam, he became a bookkeeper for an export company. After two years of saving, he relocated to the United States at the age of 20. Arriving in San Francisco in 1902, Somerville initially planned to save up and attend Howard University.

Somerville was quickly disheartened by the racism and segregation that he saw in America. In one early incident, Somerville attempted to order food from a restaurant but was told that they do not serve Black people. The discrimination that Somerville was faced with hindered his ability to acquire food, shelter, and employment. As he could not find employment in San Francisco, Somerville moved to Redlands, California, and worked odd jobs. In Redlands, Somerville lived with a Black family and worked in a bowling alley. The bowling alley owner's brother-in-law taught at the Herman Ostrow School of Dentistry at the University of Southern California (USC). John decided that he wanted to pursue dentistry as well so he continued to save money until he could afford tuition.

In 1903, Somerville moved to Los Angeles and enrolled in USC's dentistry school. On his first day of class, Somerville's white classmates threatened to leave unless he was dismissed. These students had a meeting with the dean, Garrett Newkirk, to present their petition. Newkirk invited Somerville to the meeting and praised his credentials. Somerville addressed the other students by challenging their prejudiced attitudes, asserting that racism has no place in educational institutions. Ultimately, Somerville continued his education and the petition was dropped. Somerville graduated with high honors in 1907, becoming the first African American to graduate from USC with a Doctor of dental surgery. Afterwards, Somerville passed the state dental board exam with the highest score recorded up until that point.

== Career and marriage ==
Somerville opened his own dental office in Los Angeles after graduating from University of South California. Serving mostly white patients at first, Somerville's clientele became increasingly diverse over the years as more people of color moved to Los Angeles.

John Somerville married Vada Watson in 1912, whom he met at college. Originally intending to return to Jamaica, Somerville decided to stay in the United States after marriage. Vada initially worked as an assistant in John's dental practice, but when the United States entered World War I, John was concerned that he would be drafted to join the military. Convinced of Vada's aptitude, John encouraged her to enroll in USC's dentistry program to take up the practice. Vada graduated in 1918, becoming the first Black woman to graduate from USC's dentistry school and the first woman licensed to practice dentistry in California. As John did not end up getting drafted, he and Vada began to run the practice together. After a decade of sharing an office, Vada retired from dentistry in 1933 as tensions developed between her patients and John.

Somerville became the second Black member of the Los Angeles Chamber of Commerce in history. In 1927, Somerville founded the Physicians, Dentists, and Pharmacists Association of Southern California. Somerville's professional activities also included real estate investments.

== Civil rights activism ==
John and Vada Somerville were involved in civil rights activities both local and national. After becoming an American citizen, Somerville became active in the progressive movement and took part in a conference with Theodore Roosevelt. The Somervilles' civil rights and anti-racism activities led John to contact W. E. B. Du Bois, one of the founders of the National Association for the Advancement of Colored People (NAACP) in 1909. Du Bois visited Los Angeles to give speeches and he provided the inspiration for the formation of the Los Angeles chapter of the NAACP. Du Bois stayed in the Somervilles' guest room, and his visit was the beginning of a life-long friendship with the Somervilles.

In 1913, the Somverilles received materials from the national NAACP, asking if they would like to start a local branch of the organization and to list contacts who would support the initiative. John and Vada Sommerville co-founded the Los Angeles branch of the NAACP at their residence in 1914. John became the branch's first vice-president, a position he would hold for the next decade. Somerville also served on the NAACP's national board after being elected by the NAACP's national executive to the board of directors in 1927.

== Entrepreneurship ==
After World War I, Los Angeles's Black population experienced substantial growth. However, due to segregationist Jim Crow laws and redlining, many Black people could not find housing to rent or buy. And even if they could, the housing would often be substandard. To address the housing demand, John decided to leverage his real estate experience to build affordable, quality housing for Black folk. Despite initial reluctance from lenders, John was able to secure capital by obtaining commitments from 30 people willing to move into the apartments. In 1925, John built a 26-unit apartment complex which he named "La Vada Apartments" in tribute to his wife. These apartments were an attempt to address the unequal housing conditions for Los Angeles's Black population.

Following the La Vada apartments venture, John and Vada built Hotel Somerville in 1928. Hotel Somerville was one of the few upscale Black hotels in America at the time, catering to Black Americans who were otherwise excluded from the white-owned establishments in Los Angeles. John became aware of the exclusion brought upon by segregationist policies due to his experiences being denied rooms in white-owned hotels. In one specific incident, he was unable to find a hotel providing accommodations to Black guests during a trip to San Francisco. Hotel Somerville was one of the few major hotels serving Black people in Los Angeles and was dubbed the Waldorf–Astoria of Black America. In the summer of 1928, Hotel Somerville hosted the NAACP's 19th annual national convention, which was the first national convention on the West Coast. Hotel Somerville would continue to serve as the headquarters for the Los Angeles NAACP branch.

Hotel Somerville became a hub for Black life in Los Angeles. Visitors included Black intellectuals active in civil rights and Black celebrities. Notable guests included W. E. B. Du Bois, Duke Ellington, Count Basie, Bill Robinson, Eddie "Rochester" Anderson, and Langston Hughes. Despite the hotel's initial success, the onset of the depression and the subsequent stock market crash in 1929 caused Somerville to lose a lot of money. Somerville was ultimately forced to sell the hotel. Hotel Somerville was renamed Dunbar Hotel in honor of the Black poet Paul Laurence Dunbar by the new owners.

== Later life ==
After the stock market crash, Somerville recovered financially through his dental practice and continued his involvement in political activities and civil rights. He served as a technical advisor for the California State Relief Administration that was established in response to the Great Depression.Somerville endeavored to integrate the Black population into the program. During World War II, Somerville served on the advisory board of the Los Angeles draft board and additionally became the examining dentist for the board. He was also appointed to the Los Angeles Police Commission by Mayor Fletcher Bowron, becoming the commission's first Black member and serving from 1949 to 1953. For his contributions in Anglo-American affairs, Queen Elizabeth II named Somerville an Officer of the Order of the British Empire.

Somerville was an active member of the Democratic Party, and met many prominent members such as Franklin D. Roosevelt. In 1936, Somerville was a delegate to the 1936 Democratic National Convention in Philadelphia. He was the first African-America from California to represent the Democratic Party as a delegate in the national convention. In 1951, Somerville was briefly considered by Harry S. Truman as a candidate for the governorship of the Virgin Islands.

== Personal life and death ==
In 1949, Somerville's autobiography titled Man of Color was published. John and Vada Somerville did not have any children of their own, but they did have a foster daughter named Doris Howard. Somerville retired in 1963, at the age of 71. On October 12, 1972, John and Vada celebrated their 60th wedding anniversary. Vada Somerville died shortly afterwards at the age of 86 on October 12, 1972. John Somerville died at the age of 91 at Good Samaritan Hospital in Los Angeles on February 11, 1973.

An inscription on the painting of a sailing ship that hung in Somerville's home captured his attitude towards life: “Do not wait for your ship to come in. Row out and meet it”.
