= Stanley Malamed =

American dentist & dental anesthesiologist

- Malamed with an attendee of an IV sedation course, September 2017
- Born: March 14, 1944; The Bronx, New York City

Stanley F. Malamed is an American dentist and dental anesthesiologist.

== Early life ==
Malamed was born in the Bronx, New York. He was adopted and raised Jewish.

== Education ==
Graduating from New York University College of Dentistry in 1969, Malamed completed a 2-year residency in anesthesiology at Montefiore Medical Center in The Bronx, New York. Following this, he served for 2 years in the United States Army Dental Command at Fort Knox, Kentucky.

== Career ==
In 1973, Malamed joined the faculty of Herman Ostrow School of Dentistry of USC in Los Angeles, California. He is a diplomate of the American Dental Board of Anesthesiology.

He began his first textbook when a publisher came to Herman Ostrow School of Dentistry of USC and discussed buying textbooks for his courses. He decided the previous texts were outdated and was asked to write an updated textbook. Malamed has written more than 160 scientific papers and has contributed numerous chapters to various textbooks as well.

Malamed was named a Continuing Education Leader in 2017.
