= Hessam Nowzari =

American academic

Hessam Nowzari is the Director of the University of Southern California Advanced Periodontics program, since 1995, and is a diplomate of the American Board of Periodontology.

== Biography ==
Nowzari was born in Shiraz, Iran and was the youngest director at the University of Southern California Advanced Periodontics program (1995-2012) where he established a program that mirror's Nowzari's stances on key issues in periodontology.

Nowzari is the founder of the Taipei Academy of Reconstructive Dentistry in Taiwan and one of only two American members of the Dnipropetrovsk State Academy of Medical Sciences in Ukraine. For the first time in the recent history of Israel, he was the first non-Jewish Iranian of a Persian heritage to be the keynote speaker at the Israel Dental Association Congress, possibly the largest dental event to be held in Israel.

In 2002, he joined the National Institute of Transplantation (NIT) to study the relationship between periodontal disease and transplant complications. He is also an editor of one of the leading reference publications, Aesthetic Periodontal Therapy: Periodontology 2000.

He also established a periodontic/orthodontic course at the University of Southern California. Its biological research stresses the role of viruses, mainly the herpes virus family, in periodontal disease. Surgically, it is known for its position against using animal or human cadaver products in bone or soft tissue augmentation due to their potential for contamination of the surgical site. Nowzari is known for his advocacy against early in life periodontal disease (aggressive periodontitis). In an effort to bring international attention to this cause, he made the movie "The Enemy of the Smile: AA - An Ancient Bacterium" which debuted in 2010.

== Research ==
In 1994, Nowzari challenged membrane guided tissue regeneration through a series of research publications, showing that the membrane is actually a source of infection to the grafted site.

=== Research in the field of bone grafting has been focused on autogenous sources ===
- Rafiee, Rafiel M (2011). Dental papilla analysis: A multifactorial view point (Thesis). ProQuest 914190602.
- D 'addona, Antonio; Nowzari, Hessam (2001). "Intramembranous autogenous osseous transplants in aesthetic treatment of alveolar atrophy". Periodontology 2000. 27: 148–61. doi:10.1034/j.1600-0757.2001.027001148.x. PMID 11551306.
- Nowzari H, Aalam AA (May 2007). "Mandibular cortical bone graft part 2: surgical technique, applications, and morbidity". Compendium of Continuing Education in Dentistry. 28 (5): 274–80, quiz 281–2. PMID 17607892.
- Aalam AA, Nowzari H (April 2007). "Mandibular cortical bone grafts part 1: anatomy, healing process, and influencing factors". Compendium of Continuing Education in Dentistry. 28 (4): 206–12, quiz 213. PMID 17487046.
- Nowzari H, Botero JE, Rich SK (March 2010). "The impact of early-in-life periodontal infection on the smiles of children: a worldwide view". Compendium of Continuing Education in Dentistry. 31 (2): 154, 156–8, 160 passim. PMID 20344901.

=== Orthodontics ===
- Nowzari H, Yorita FK, Chang HC (May 2008). "Periodontally accelerated osteogenic orthodontics combined with autogenous bone grafting". Compendium of Continuing Education in Dentistry. 29 (4): 200–6, quiz 207, 218. PMID 18533317.
- Yaghoubzadeh, Allen (2009). "A Dynamic Analysis: the Smile and Display of Dentition during Speech". SoDM Masters Theses (Paper 173).

=== Implantology ===
- Nowzari, Hessam; Chee, Winston; Yi, Klaus; Pak, Mark; Chung, Woun Ho; Rich, Sandra (2006). "Scalloped Dental Implants: A Retrospective Analysis of Radiographic and Clinical Outcomes of 17 NobelPerfectTM Implants in 6 Patients". Clinical Implant Dentistry and Related Research. 8 (1): 1–10. doi:10.2310/j.6480.2005.00034.x. PMID 16681488.
- Nowzari H, Chee W, Tuan A, Abou-Rass M, Landesman HM (July 1998). "Clinical and microbiological aspects of the Sargon immediate load implant". Compendium of Continuing Education in Dentistry. 19 (7): 686–9, 693–4, 696 passim. PMID 9780889.
- Aalam AA, Nowzari H (2005). "Clinical evaluation of dental implants with surfaces roughened by anodic oxidation, dual acid-etched implants, and machined implants". The International Journal of Oral & Maxillofacial Implants. 20 (5): 793–8. PMID 16274156.
- Schincaglia, Gian Pietro; Nowzari, Hessam (2001). "Surgical treatment planning for the single-unit implant in aesthetic areas". Periodontology 2000. 27: 162–82. doi:10.1034/j.1600-0757.2001.027001162.x. PMID 11551307.
- Nowzari, Hessam; Botero, Javier Enrique; Degiacomo, Marina; Villacres, Maria C.; Rich, Sandra K. (2008). "Microbiology and Cytokine Levels Around Healthy Dental Implants and Teeth". Clinical Implant Dentistry and Related Research. 10 (3): 166–73. doi:10.1111/j.1708-8208.2007.00076.x. PMID 18218050.
- Nowzari H (August 2001). "Esthetic implant dentistry". Compendium of Continuing Education in Dentistry. 22 (8): 643–50, 652–4, quiz 655. PMID 11913318.
- Nowzari, Hessam; Yi, Klaus; Chee, Winston; Rich, Sandra K. (2008). "Immunology, Microbiology, and Virology Following Placement of NobelPerfect Scalloped Dental Implants: Analysis of a Case Series". Clinical Implant Dentistry and Related Research. 10 (3): 157–65. doi:10.1111/j.1708-8208.2007.00075.x. PMID 18218051.
- Tabanella, Giorgio; Nowzari, Hessam; Slots, Jorgen (2009). "Clinical and Microbiological Determinants of Ailing Dental Implants". Clinical Implant Dentistry and Related Research. 11 (1): 24–36. doi:10.1111/j.1708-8208.2008.00088.x. PMID 18384407.

=== Guided Tissue Regeneration ===
The theory of guiding periodontal healing with the use of a barrier membrane was challenged by Nowzari and Jorgen Slots in a series of articles: Guided bone and tissue regeneration.

- Zarkesh, Niloofar; Nowzari, Hessam; Morrison, John L.; Slots, Jorgen (1999). "Tetracycline-Coated Polytetrafluoroethylene Barrier Membranes in the Treatment of Intraosseous Periodontal Lesions". Journal of Periodontology. 70 (9): 1008–16. doi:10.1902/jop.1999.70.9.1008. PMID 10505803.
- Slots, JøRgen; MacDonald, Erika Smith; Nowzari, Hessam (1999). "Infectious aspects of periodontal regeneration". Periodontology 2000. 19: 164–72. doi:10.1111/j.1600-0757.1999.tb00154.x. PMID 10321223.
- Smith MacDonald E, Nowzari H, Contreras A, Flynn J, Morrison J, Slots J (April 1998). "Clinical and microbiological evaluation of a bioabsorbable and a nonresorbable barrier membrane in the treatment of periodontal intraosseous lesions". Journal of Periodontology. 69 (4): 445–53. doi:10.1902/jop.1998.69.4.445. PMID 9609375.
- Nowzari H, MacDonald ES, Flynn J, London RM, Morrison JL, Slots J (July 1996). "The dynamics of microbial colonization of barrier membranes for guided tissue regeneration". Journal of Periodontology. 67 (7): 694–702. doi:10.1902/jop.1996.67.7.694. PMID 8832481.
- Nowzari H, London R, Slots J (October 1995). "The importance of periodontal pathogens in guided periodontal tissue regeneration and guided bone regeneration". Compendium of Continuing Education in Dentistry. 16 (10): 1042, 1044, 1046 passim, quiz 1058. PMID 8603308.
- Nowzari, Hessam; Matian, Fariborz; Slots, Jorgen (1995). "Periodontal pathogens on polytetrafluoroethylene membrane for guided tissue regeneration inhibit healing". Journal of Clinical Periodontology. 22 (6): 469–74. doi:10.1111/j.1600-051X.1995.tb00179.x. PMID 7560226.
- Nowzari H, Slots J (1995). "Microbiologic and clinical study of polytetrafluoroethylene membranes for guided bone regeneration around implants". The International Journal of Oral & Maxillofacial Implants. 10 (1): 67–73. PMID 7615319.
- Nowzari, Hessam; Slots, Jorgen (1994). "Microorganisms in polytetrafluoroethylene barrier membranes for guided tissue regeneration". Journal of Clinical Periodontology. 21 (3): 203–10. doi:10.1111/j.1600-051X.1994.tb00305.x. PMID 8157775.
