= Vineyard, Utah =

City in Utah, United States

- City (4th Class)
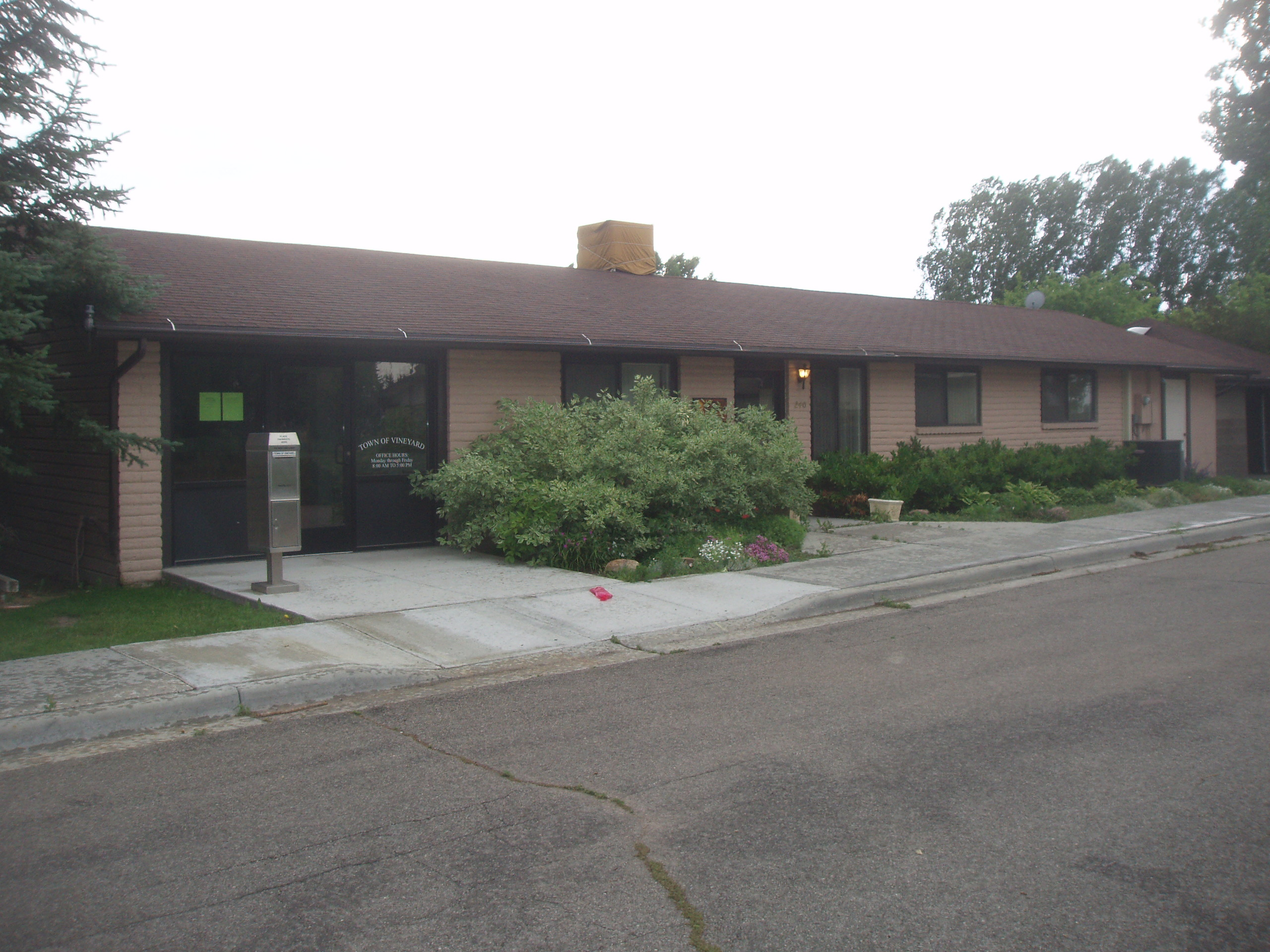
- Original Vineyard town office
- Motto: Stay Connected
- Location in Utah County and the state of Utah
- Coordinates: 40°18′24″N 111°42′52″W
- Country: United States
- State: Utah
- County: Utah
- Incorporated: May 11, 1989

Government
  - Type: Council–Manager

Area
  - Total: 6.35 sq mi (16.45 km^{2})
  - Land: 4.80 sq mi (12.42 km^{2})
  - Water: 1.56 sq mi (4.03 km^{2})
- Elevation: 4,521 ft (1,378 m)

Population (July 1, 2022)
  - Total: 14,535
  - Density: 2,924.7/sq mi (1,129.22/km^{2})
- Time zone: UTC−7 (Mountain (MST))
  - Summer (DST): UTC−6 (MDT)
- ZIP Code: 84059
- Area codes: 385 and 801
- FIPS code: 49-80420
- GNIS feature ID: 2413434
- Website: www.vineyardutah.gov

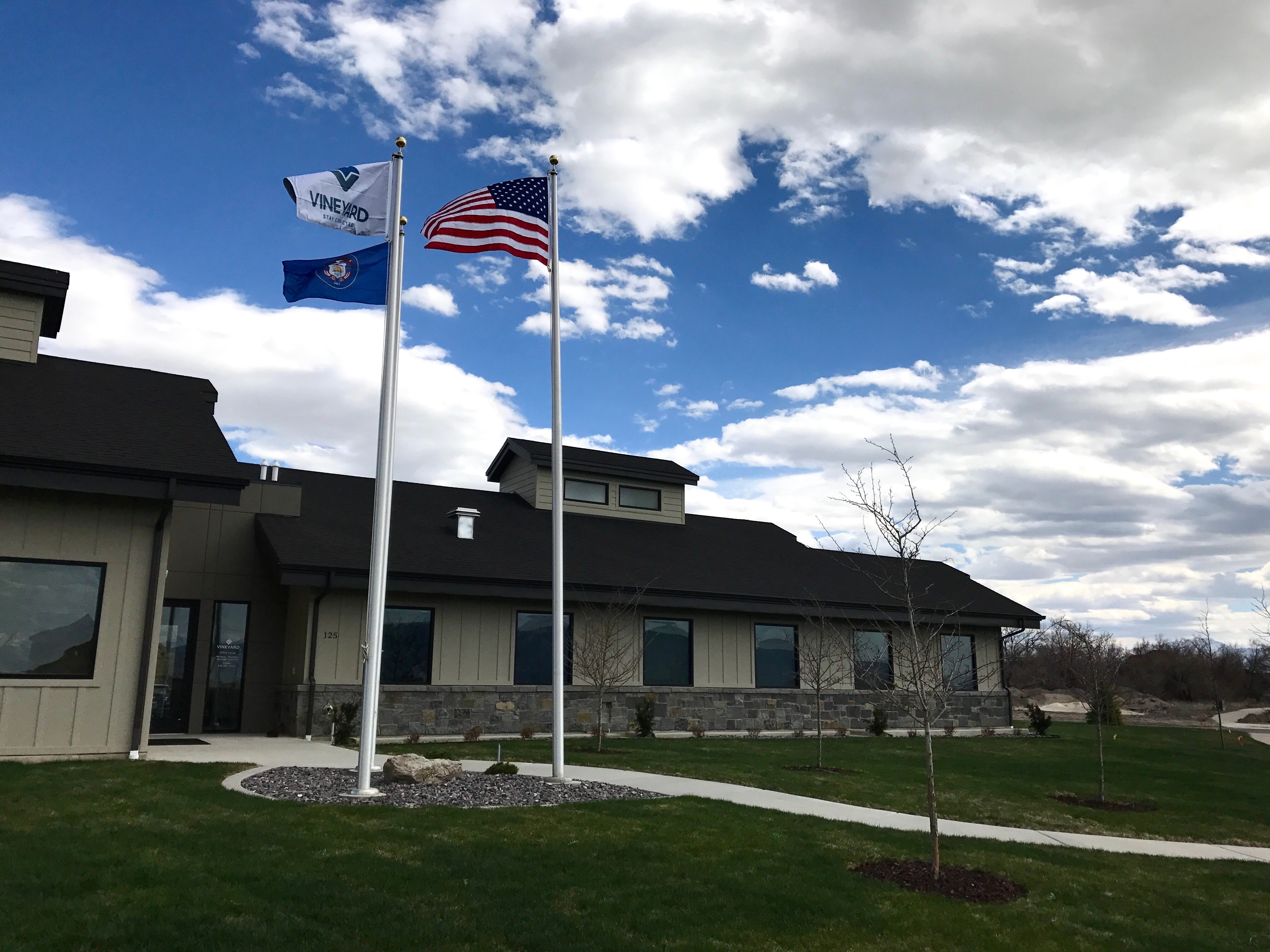
Vineyard City Offices

Vineyard is a city in Utah County, Utah, United States. It is part of the Provo–Orem Metropolitan Statistical Area. The population grew from 139 at the 2010 census to 12,543 at the 2020 census making it the fastest growing city in Utah and one of the fastest-growing cities in the nation during that timeframe. Population has grown dramatically since about 2012 due to redevelopment of the former Geneva Steel site which sits in Vineyard.

== History ==
The community was named for grape vineyards near the original town site. According to some town residents, Vineyard first became a distinct place in 1899. The town incorporated in 1989.

Vineyard was certified as a city of the 5th class (1,000–10,000 residents) during the summer of 2016. Prior to 2016, Vineyard was classified as a town.

Population has grown dramatically since about 2012 due to redevelopment of the former Geneva Steel site which sits in Vineyard and was idle since Geneva went out of business in 2002. Starting in 2011, Utah Valley University purchased hundreds of acres in Vineyard to create a secondary campus a few miles west of their main facilities.

In 2025, Utah state financial auditor Tina Cannon issued a report stating Vineyard had for the previous four years neglected to report to the state what she described as "substantial" financial transactions amounting to some $35 million. These transactions had been listed on Vineyard's general ledger, but had not been reported to a state-level transparency office as required by code.

== Geography ==
According to the United States Census Bureau, the town has a total area of 6.4 square miles (16.5 km^{2}), of which 4.4 square miles (11.3 km^{2}) is land and 2.0 square miles (5.2 km^{2}), or 31.53%, is water.

== Demographics ==
Historical population
Census	Pop.	Note	%±
1990	151		—
2000	150		−0.7%
2010	139		−7.3%
2020	12,543		8,923.7%
U.S. Census QuickFacts Vineyard town, Utah

As of the census of 2020, there were 12,543 people living in Vineyard. The racial makeup of the city was 81.5% White alone, 2.5% Black or African American alone, and 4.2% from two or more races. Hispanic or Latino of any race were 10.2% of the population.

In 2000, there were 43 households, out of which 30.2% had children under the age of 18 living with them, 83.7% were married couples living together, 4.7% had a female householder with no husband present, and 11.6% were non-families. 11.6% of all households were made up of individuals, and 7.0% had someone living alone who was 65 years of age or older. The average household size was 3.49 and the average family size was 3.76.

In 2020, 33.8% of the population was under 18 years old (including 14.4% under 5) and 1.1% of the population was over 65 years old. 7.8% of the population was foreign born. The median income for a household in the city was $80,868 (in 2020 dollars). The per capita income for the city was $29,004. 9.3% of the population was below the poverty line.

According to the US Census 2015 Population Estimate Vineyard had the fastest growth from 2013 to 2014 and from 2014 to 2015 of any city or town in the entire USA with a 417% growth. The second highest growth was only 59%.

== Education ==
Vineyard Public Schools are part of the Alpine School District, but are scheduled to become part of the newly organized Timpanogos School District in mid-2027. There are two public schools in Vinyard:

- Vineyard Elementary (K–6 Public)
- Trailside Elementary (K–6 Public)

And two charter schools:

- Franklin Discovery Academy (K–6 Charter)
- Freedom Preparatory Academy (K–5 Charter)

== Recreation ==
=== Parks ===
- Gammon Park
- Lakeside Sports Park (West side)
- Sunset Beach Park
- Vineyard Grove Park
- Penny Springs Park
- Rendezvous Park

=== Active transportation ===
Vineyard has an extensive trail system. The city was awarded a Bronze level Bicycle Friendly Community award in 2020 by the League of American Bicyclists for its efforts to promote walking and biking in the city.

Vineyard also has a FrontRunner station which completed construction in August 2022. Utah Transit Authority also operates multiple bus routes that travel through Vineyard as well.

== Notable people ==
- Reed Holdaway, orthodontist
- Chief Walkara, Shoshone leader
