= Bone destruction patterns in periodontal disease =

In periodontal disease, not only does the bone that supports the teeth, known as alveolar bone, reduce in height in relation to the teeth, but the morphology of the remaining alveolar bone is altered. The bone destruction patterns that occur as a result of periodontal disease generally take on characteristic forms.

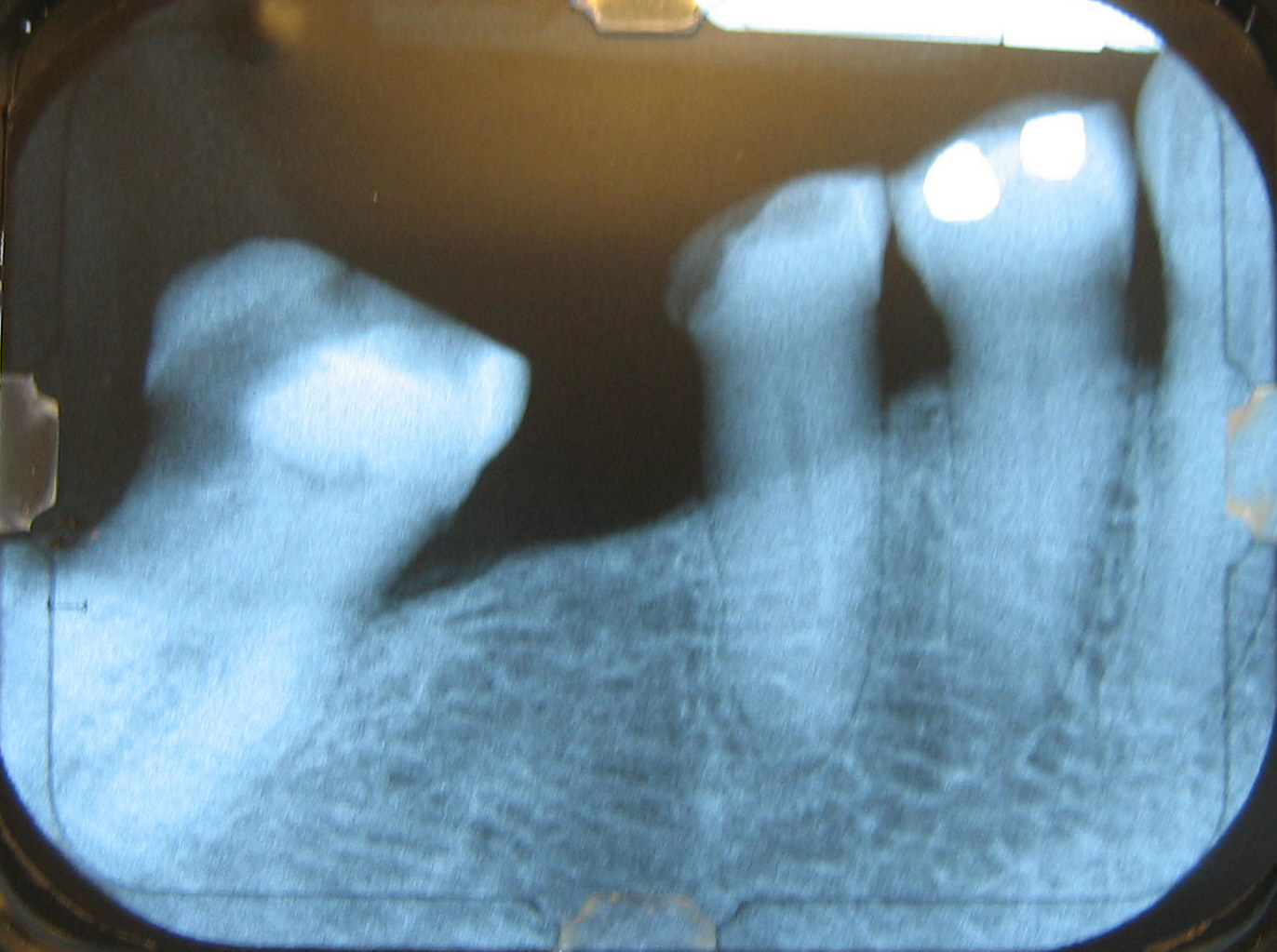
This X-ray film displays a horizontal defect.

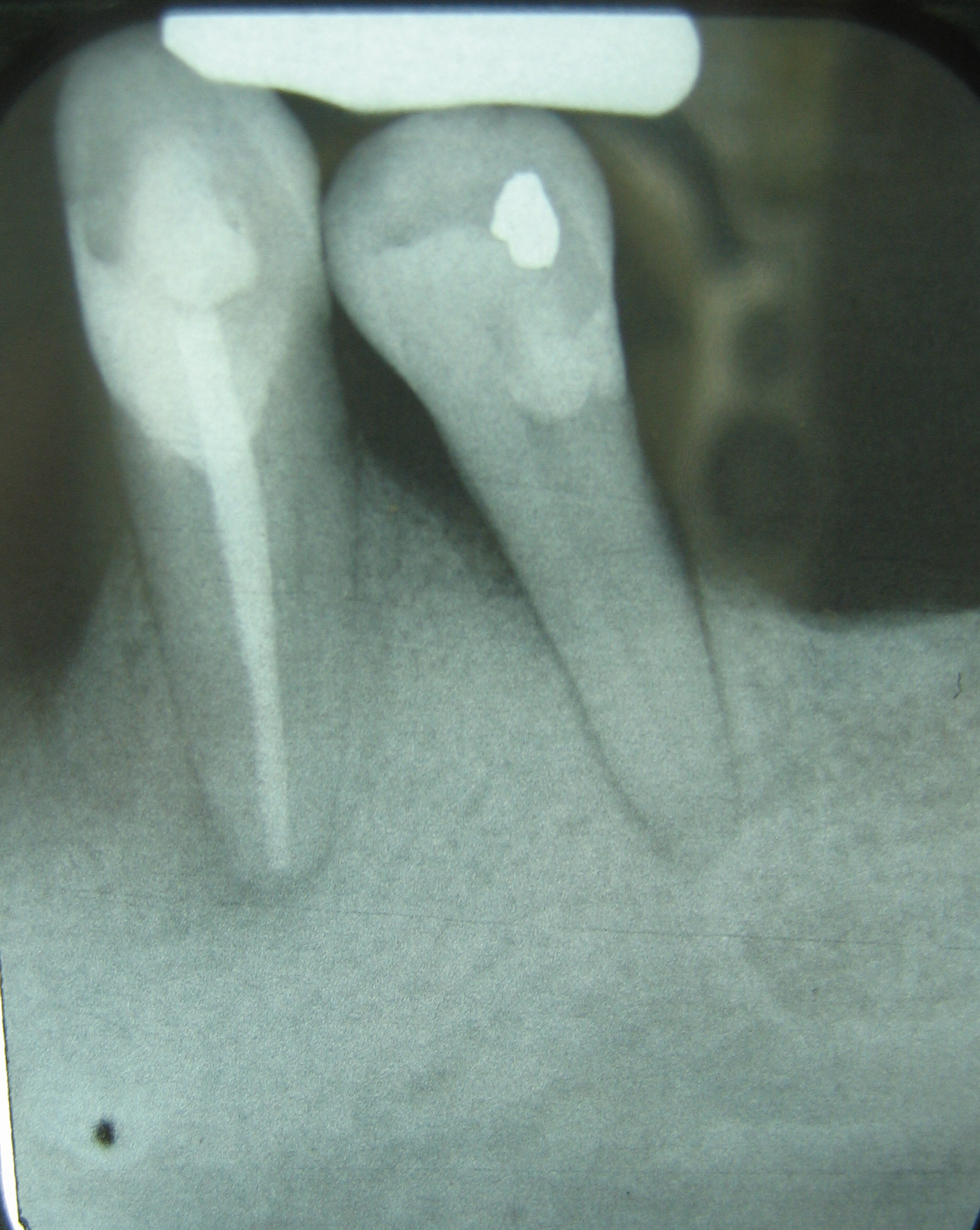
This X-ray film displays two lone-standing mandibular teeth, #21 and #22: the lower left first premolar and canine, exhibiting severe bone loss of 30-50%. Widening of the PDL surrounding the premolar is likely due to secondary oclcusal trauma.

== Types of destruction ==
There are four chief types of bone defects that present in the alveolar bone:

1. horizontal defects
2. vertical, or angular, defects
3. fenestrations
4. dehiscences

=== Horizontal defects ===
Generalized bone loss occurs most frequently as horizontal bone loss. Horizontal bone loss manifests as a somewhat even degree of bone resorption so that the height of the bone in relation to the teeth has been uniformly decreased, as indicated in the radiograph to the rig defects occur adjacent to a tooth and usually in the form of a triangular area of missing bone, known as triangulation.
