= Aggregatibacter actinomycetemcomitans =

Scientific classification
- Domain: Bacteria
- Kingdom: Pseudomonadati
- Phylum: Pseudomonadota
- Class: Gammaproteobacteria
- Order: Pasteurellales
- Family: Pasteurellaceae
- Genus: Aggregatibacter
- Species: A. actinomycetemcomitans

Binomial name
- Aggregatibacter actinomycetemcomitans (Klinger 1912) Nørskov-Lauritsen and Kilian 2006

Synonyms
- Actinobacillus actinomycetemcomitans (Klinger 1912) Topley and Wilson 1929 (Approved Lists 1980); "Bacterium actinomycetemcomitans" Klinger 1912; Haemophilus actinomycetemcomitans (Klinger 1912) Potts et al. 1985

Species of bacterium

Aggregatibacter actinomycetemcomitans is a Gram-negative, facultative anaerobe, nonmotile bacterium that is often found in association with localized aggressive periodontitis, a severe infection of the periodontium. It is also suspected to be involved in chronic periodontitis. Less frequently, A. actinomycetemcomitans is associated with nonoral infections such as endocarditis. Its role in aggressive periodontitis was first discovered by Danish-born periodontist Jørgen Slots, a professor of dentistry and microbiology at the University of Southern California School of Dentistry.

'Bacterium actinomycetem comitans' was first described by Klinger (1912) as coccobacillary bacteria isolated with Actinomyces from actinomycotic lesions in humans. It was reclassified as Actinobacillus actinomycetemcomitans by Topley & Wilson (1929) and as Haemophilus actinomycetemcomitans by Potts et al. (1985). The species has attracted attention because of its association with localized aggressive periodontitis.

== Nomenclature ==
Recent studies have shown a phylogenetic similarity of A. actinomycetemcomitans and Haemophilus aphrophilus, H. paraphrophilus, and H. segnis, suggesting the new genus Aggregatibacter for them.

== Importance ==
It is one of the bacteria that might be implicated in destructive periodontal disease. Although it has been found more frequently in localized aggressive periodontitis, prevalence in any population is rather high. It has also been isolated from actinomycotic lesions (mixed infection with certain Actinomyces species, in particular A. israelii). It possesses certain virulence factors that enable it to invade tissues, such as the pore-forming toxin leukotoxin A. It has also been isolated from women with bacterial vaginosis and as an etiologic agent in endocarditis. The pore-forming toxin LtxA of A. actinomycetemcomitans may be a trigger of the autoimmune disease rheumatoid arthritis due to its ability to stimulate protein citrullination, a post-translational protein modification targeted by autoantibodies in this disease.

== Virulence factors ==
- Leukotoxin A: kills granulocytes, monocytes, and other white blood cells expressing integrin beta-2 (CD18)
- Cytolethal distending toxin
- Immunosuppression factors that inhibit blastogenesis, antibody production, and activate T-suppressor cells
- Inhibition of granulocyte functions
- Resistant to complement-mediated killing
- Lipopolysaccharides
- Surface antigens
- Heat shock proteins
- Antimicrobial resistance

== A. actinomycetemcomitans serotypes ==
- a strain, for example ATCC 29523, frequently in oral cavity, variable leukotoxin expression
- b strain Y4, most frequently in localized aggressive periodontitis, high leukotoxin expression; of the b subset, clone Jp2 is particularly leukotoxic
- c strain ATCC 33384, low leukotoxin expression
- serotypes d, e, f, g
- within each serotype, leukotoxin expression can be highly variable between strains

== Small RNA ==
In bacteria, small RNAs are involved in gene regulation. Jorth et al. identified 9 sRNA by Northern blotting from computer-predicted candidates in strain VT1169 and 202 sRNA by RNA seq in strain 624. A systematic screen by RNA-seq and RT-PCR in HK1651 strain (a clinical isolate from an aggressive periodontitis patient), quantified 70 sRNAs and further identified 17 differentially expressed sRNAs during growth phases. Target prediction indicated possibility of sRNA interaction with several virulence genes. This study confirmed the presence of one of previously identified Fur regulated sRNAs JA04 identified in strain HK1651.

== See also ==
- List of bacterial vaginosis microbiota
- Oral microbiology
