= Aggressive periodontitis =

Type of inflammatory gum disease

Aggressive periodontitis describes a type of periodontal disease and includes two of the seven classifications of periodontitis as defined by the 1999 classification system:

1. Localized aggressive periodontitis (LAP)
2. Generalized aggressive periodontitis (GAP)

LAP is localised to first molar or incisor interproximal attachment loss, whereas GAP is the interproximal attachment loss affecting at least three permanent teeth other than incisors and first molar. The prevalence of LAP is less than 1% and that of GAP is 0.13%. Approximately 0.1% of white Caucasians (with 0.1% in northern and in central Europe, 0.5% in southern Europe, and 0.1–0.2% in North America) and 2.6% of black Africans may have LAP. Estimates of the disease prevalence are 1–5% in the African population and in groups of African descent, 2.6% in African-Americans, 0.5–1.0% in Hispanics in North America, 0.3–2.0% in South America, and 0.2–1.0% in Asia. On the other hand, in Asia, the prevalence rate of 1.2% for LAP and 0.6% for GAP in Baghdad and Iran population, and 0.47% in Japanese population.

Therefore, the prevalence of LAP varies considerably between continents, and differences in race or ethnicity seem to be a major contributing factor.

Aggressive periodontitis is much less common than chronic periodontitis and generally affects younger patients than does the chronic form. Around 1 in every 1000 patients experience more rapid loss of attachment. Males seem to be at higher risk of GAP than females

The localized and generalized forms are not merely different in extent; they differ in etiology and pathogenesis.

== Etiology ==
=== Microbiology ===
Of the microflora characterised in aggressive periodontitis, approximately 65–75% of bacteria are Gram-negative bacilli, with few spirochaetes or motile rods present. Aggressive periodontitis is often characterised by a rapid loss of periodontal attachment associated with highly pathogenic bacteria and an impaired immune response. Various studies have associated Aggregatibacter actinomycetemcomitans, formerly known as Actinobacillus actinomycetemcomitans, with aggressive periodontitis. An early study dating back to 1983 explains its prevalence and documents its role in localised aggressive periodontitis.

Virulence factors are the attributes of microorganisms that enable it to colonise a particular niche in its host, overcome the host defences and initiate a disease process. Fives Taylor et al. (2000) have categorised the virulence factors of Aggregatibacter actinomycetemcomitans as follows.

Promote colonization and persistence in the oral cavity:	Interfere with host defences:	Destroy host tissues:	Inhibit host repair of tissues:
Adhesins	Leukotoxin	Cytotoxins	Inhibitors of fibroblast proliferation
Invasins	Chemotactic inhibitors	Collagenase	Inhibitors of fibroblast proliferation
Bacteriocins	Immunosuppressive proteins	Bone resorption agents	Inhibitors of bone formation
Antibiotic resistance	Fc-binding proteins	Stimulators of inflammatory mediators	Inhibitors of bone formation

Samaranayake notes the evidence for the specific involvement of Aggregatibacter actinomycetemcomitans includes: an increased incidence of it found in subgingival plaque obtained from lesional sites, high level of its antibody which tends to fall following successful treatment, its possession of a wide range of potentially pathogenic products and its elimination with concordant disease regression, following treatment with successful periodontal therapy and adjunctive tetracycline.

Porphyromonas gingivalis is a Gram-negative anaerobe associated with the pathogenicity of periodontal disease, and aggressive periodontitis is no exception. Greater numbers of both Porphyromonas gingivalis and Aggregatibacter actinomycetemcomitans were found in active, destructive periodontal lesions in comparison to non-active sites.

Capnocytophaga spp are implicated as prime periodontal pathogens, especially in localised aggressive periodontitis. Both Capnocytophaga spp and Prevotella intermedia were the most frequently detected microorganisms in a study, which also noted that Capnocytophaga spp was the most prominent bacteria in subgingival samples of patients with aggressive periodontitis.

An impaired ability of peripheral blood lymphocytes to react to chemotactic stimuli is found in the majority of patients with aggressive periodontitis. As well as Aggregatibacter actinomycetemcomitans being associated with this, the synergism of the disease also accounts for both Capnocytophaga spp and Porphyromonas gingivalis.

=== Pathophysiology ===
Aggressive periodontitis is a multifactorial disease with many complex interactions including host factors, microbiology and genetics.

Host defences involve multiple factors; saliva, epithelium, inflammatory response, immune response and chemical mediators. The inflammatory exudate in the gingival tissues and gingival crevicular fluid is mostly polymorph neutrophils but also includes B cells and plasma cells. The neutrophils may show an intrinsic functional defect and respond abnormally when challenged by certain pathogens. The plasma cells produce specific antibodies in response to the periodontal pathogens, which diffuse into the gingival crevicular fluid. They produce mainly IgG, with some IgA. It has been suggested that these gingival crevicular fluid antibody levels could be potentially useful in the development of a vaccine. Patients with localised aggressive periodontitis have large amount of Aggregatibacter actinomycetemcomitans specific IgG2. This is suggested to be protective against wider spread periodontal breakdown. However, patients with generalized aggressive periodontitis have decreased ability to mount high titres of IgG to Porphyromonas gingivalis and Aggregatibacter actinomycetemcomitans.

It has also been found that a low T-helper to T-suppressor ratio is found in aggressive periodontitis which may alter local immune regulation. Monocytes respond to bacterial and inflammatory stimuli with very high levels of local release inflammatory mediators and induce hyper-inflammatory reaction with activation of tissue degrading matrix-metalloproteinases. These is also evidence they produce increased amounts IL-1α and IL-1β which cause osteoclastic bone resorption. These amounts are greatly reduced following treatment.

Studies of families, twins and sibling pairs have provided strong evidence for a genetic basis for aggressive periodontitis. A person's genetic predisposition to the condition is determined by a single gene of major effect, inherited as an autosomal dominant trait. However, for the disease process to initiate the person must be exposed to the presence of periodontal pathogens and potentially also various environmental factors.

Smoking is a generalized risk factor for generalized forms of aggressive periodontitis. Studies found that smokers have more affected teeth than non-smokers and high levels of attachment loss. This is due to the suppression of serum IgG2 and antibody against Aggregatibacter actinomycetemcomitans found in smokers.

== Features ==
According to the 1999 International Workshop for the Classification of Periodontal Diseases, aggressive periodontitis was defined according to 3 primary features, in contrast to chronic periodontitis. These features are common for both localized and generalized form of disease.

=== Primary features ===
- Patients are clinically healthy.

Patients do not have any underlying systemic disease that would contribute to aggressive periodontitis. For instance, diabetes is proved to be associated with periodontitis- it is a major risk factor when glycaemic control is poor.

- The rate of loss of attachment and bone loss is rapid.

Loss of attachment refers to the destruction of periodontium whereas the bone refers to the alveolar bone supporting the teeth. The loss can be determined by using a calibrated periodontal probe and taking radiographs of the dentition. Usually the loss of attachment is greater than 2mm per year.

- Aggressive periodontitis runs in the patient's family.

Familial aggregation of aggressive periodontitis is often discovered by taking a thorough medical history of the patient. The patient is said to have a high genetic susceptibility to aggressive periodontitis. Many studies have shown that genetic factors contribute to the pathogenesis of this disease. In this case, the manifestation of aggressive periodontitis is believed to be the result of genetic mutation, combined with environmental factors.

=== Secondary features ===
Secondary features are characteristics which are frequently seen but not always present in every patient diagnosed with aggressive periodontitis.

- The severity of periodontal tissue destruction is out of proportion to amount of bacteria present.

The amount of bacteria is often indicated by the level of dental plaque. This feature implies that when aggressive periodontitis is present, loss of attachment and bone loss tend to occur even if the plaque level is low.

- High levels of Aggregatibacter (or Actinobacillus) actinomycetemcomitans and, in some populations, Porphyromonas gingivalis.

These gram-negative microbes are considered the chief aetiological agent of aggressive periodontitis. They are implicated in the development of aggressive periodontitis by triggering inflammatory response in periodontal tissue.

- There are abnormalities associated with phagocytes.

Phagocytes are essential in resolving inflammation. The impairment of their phagocytic activity results in persistent inflammation in periodontal tissues.

- Hyper-responsive macrophage phenotype.

Due to the increased responsiveness, the macrophages produce excessive levels of inflammatory mediator and cytokine, such as prostaglandin E2 (PGE2) and interleukin-1β (IL-1B). Their hyperactivity is associated with periodontal tissue destruction and bone loss.

- Progression of attachment loss and bone loss may be self-arresting.

In some patients, the disease may burnout without any cause-related therapy. Caries levels have seen to be lower in cases of aggressive periodontitis.

Staging Cases of aggressive periodontitis have been staged into Stage I, II and III based on the severity of the cases. The staging index was proposed based on clinical features, radiological features and possible risk factors. The proposed index was validated with 10 cases of aggressive periodontitis followed for 10 years.

== Clinical and radiographic features ==
=== Localized aggressive periodontitis ===
==== Clinical features ====
LAP begins around the age of puberty where there is interproximal loss of attachment of the first molar, and or incisors. on at least two permanent teeth (one which is a first molar) and no involvement of more than two teeth other than the first molars and incisors, lack of inflammation and evidence of deep periodontal pocket with advanced bone loss. There is also a relatively fast progression of periodontal tissue loss.

With an increase in the age of the patient, there may be progression of the disease involving the adjacent teeth and lead to the patient developing GAP. The periodontal tissue also exhibits minimal signs of inflammation clinically and show a robust response with serum antibodies to pathogens.

The amount of plaque present is inconsistent with the amount and severity of tissue destruction but with a high plaque pathogenicity due to the presence of increased levels of bacteria like Aggregatibacter actinomycetemcomitans (A.a) and Porphyromonas Gingivalis (P.g).

Secondary features of LAP may also be present including;

- diastema formation with disto-labial migration of the incisors
- increased mobility of the affected teeth, sensitivity due to exposed root,
- deep dull pain that radiates to the jaw
- periodontal abscess with lymph node enlargement

==== Radiographic features ====
Radiographically, the periodontal lesion often presents with alveolar bone loss in a horizontal pattern at the interproximal surface of the permanent first molars and usually horizontal bone pattern of bone loss at the interproximal surface of the incisors as the bone is thinner than at the interproximal surface of the molars.

The alveolar bone loss patterns are usually bilateral and similar on both sides and has been referred to as being a 'mirror-image' pattern.

In advanced cases the alveolar bone loss may be depicted as a horizontal bone loss pattern radiographically.

=== Generalized aggressive periodontitis ===
==== Clinical features ====
- Mostly in individuals under 30 years old
  - In GAP, the clinical appearance of the disease resembles chronic periodontitis. The difference is that individuals affected by GAP are much younger and the progression of disease appears more rapid.
- There is a poor serum response against infecting agents
  - Destruction is present that is not in balance with the amount of local irritants present
- Generalized inter-proximal attachment loss on 3 or more permanent teeth, excluding the first molars or incisors
  - The main distinction between the localized and generalized form of AgP lies in the number of teeth affected. GAP brings about attachment loss involving more than 30% of sites on teeth; effectively being at least three permanent teeth other than the first molars or incisors.
- Episodic nature of attachment loss Two main tissue responses have been found in GAP cases:
  - Tissue may have severe acute inflammation and often presents with an angry red appearance and ulceration. There may be spontaneous bleeding or suppuration. This response is known to be present in the destructive phase, where there is presence of bone and attachment loss.
  - The other response is known as a period of quiescence, where gingival tissue may appear with no inflammation, pink appearance with some possible stippling. In addition to this mild appearance there may be deep pockets upon probing.

==== Radiographic features ====
- The key diagnostic feature of AgP is vertical bone loss around teeth including the first molars and incisors. This tends to begin around puberty in otherwise healthy individuals. There may be an appearance of "arc-shaped loss of alveolar bone extending from the distal surface of the second premolar to the mesial surface of the second molar".
- In GAP, generalized bone destruction is present that ranges from mild crestal bone resorption to severe alveolar bone destruction, depending on the severity of the disease. There may be a combination of vertical and horizontal bone loss defects.

== Screening ==
Early diagnosis of aggressive periodontitis is important as it can cause rapid permanent destruction of the periodontal tissues. It is essential that all patients undergo a routine periodontal examination to screen for any form of periodontal disease during a dental checkup.

=== Clinical examination ===
At the start of the clinical examination of the gingival and periodontal tissues, the dental practitioner would look at the appearance of the gingiva first. A healthy periodontium in a Caucasian would appear stippled and pink with a knife edge margin where it abuts the tooth (pigmentation may differ in other races). After that, gingival probing depths would be checked. This would normally be carried out using a basic periodontal probe (WHO CPI). On probing, patients with AgP should have evidence of significant periodontal pocket depths and loss of attachment (LOA). Dental practitioners should also be aware of false pocketing around erupting/newly erupted teeth in the mixed dentition phase and also in the presence of gingival inflammation. The presence of bleeding on probing (BOP) should be noted which is an indicator of active disease.

=== Radiographs ===
Radiographic assessment should be carried out for patients with evidence of periodontitis to observe alveolar bone levels which can help to identify signs of AgP. In healthy periodontal tissues, the distance from the amelocemental junction (ACJ) to the alveolar bone crest is typically in the order of 1mm in young people. If the distance between the ACJ and alveolar bone crest is more than 2-3mm then there is a possible suggestion of AgP. In addition to that, presence of angular or vertical bone loss (especially at 6's) and arrowhead or furcation lesions are also a strong suggestion of AgP.

=== Strong family association ===
It is also important for a dental practitioner to check for family history of periodontal disease for each patient. This is because AgP may have an autosomal dominant inheritance pattern which suggests that up to 50% of siblings could be affected if one parent has the disease. Careful interpretation of the history is required but it may provide vital evidence in diagnosing AgP. If a case of Agp is diagnosed, it is important to screen the patient's family members as well for AgP. Early detection of AgP allows intervention to be carried out before extensive periodontal destruction has taken place which further simplifies treatment.

== Treatment ==
Following the initial assessment and diagnosis of AgP, a treatment plan is usually developed for each individual undergoing therapy. As the overall treatment concepts and goals for AgP are not significantly different from that of chronic periodontitis, the different treatment phases (cause related therapy; re-examination for response to therapy; definitive therapy; and maintenance) are similar for both types of periodontitis.

Nevertheless, the considerable amount of bone loss relative to the young age of the individual in AgP necessitates an often more aggressive treatment approach, to halt further periodontal destruction and regain as much periodontal attachment as possible. The objective of treatment is to create a conducive clinical condition for retaining as many teeth, for as long as possible.

=== Cause Related Therapy ===
This stage involves discussion of the disease with the patient.

- Oral Hygiene Instructions: The clinician should advise the patient of his intrinsic susceptibility to plaque, which his body induces a strong, pro-inflammatory response to. It is thus essential to keep his oral hygiene immaculate. This involve going over both smooth surfaces (tooth brushing instructions) and the use of interproximal aids (e.g. floss).
- Smoking cessation (if applicable): Smoking is a significant risk factor for AgP, with patients who smoke having more affected teeth with loss of clinical attachment and more bone loss than non-smoking patients with AgP. Non-smokers also tend to have a better response to periodontal therapy as compared to smokers. As such, individuals must be advised of the benefits of smoking cessation and the otherwise potential risks of a worsening periodontal condition.
- Removal of plaque retentive factors: Local plaque retentive factors such as mal-positioned teeth, overhanging restorations, crown and bridgework, partial dentures and fixed/removable orthodontic appliances can increase the risk of periodontal disease and prevent successful treatment and resolution of associated pockets. Prior to starting periodontal treatment, any overhanging or poorly contoured restorations should be modified or replaced. Instructions should also be given on how to clean adequately around fixed restorations and appliances, and how to clean removable prostheses. These intra-oral appliances should also be well-designed and fitting.

The periodontal therapy carried out at this stage is of a non-surgical approach, which is aimed at the removal of supra- and sub-gingival plaque and calculus deposits, to decrease the microbial load, bacteria biofilm, and calculus from the periodontally involved sites.

- Scale and Polish
- Root Surface Debridement (RSD)
- Antibiotics: There is evidence that the additional use of systemic antibiotics in conjunction with non-surgical periodontal treatment results in a more favourable clinical response, as compared to just periodontal treatment alone, as it helps to suppress pathogenic bacteria and create a health-associated biofilm. There have been many antibiotic regimes proposed for the treatment of AgP. However, the combination of choice according to current research is a combination of amoxicillin (500 mg, thrice/day) and metronidazole (200 mg, thrice/day), for 7 days, starting on the day of the final debridement. Doxycycline (100 mg, once/day, with a starting first dose of 200 mg) is the choice of antibiotics for patients allergic to penicillin.
- Photobiomodulation Therapy (PBMT), previously known as Low-Level Laser Therapy (LLLT)
- Antimicrobial Photodynamic Therapy (aPDT): This potentially has all the advantages of low-level laser therapy, which allows the disinfection of periodontal pocket and the eradication of bacteria in areas of difficult access, without the thermal damage to tissues associated with the high-powered laser. A significant reduction in the Aggregatibacter actinomycetemcomitans count following PDT suggests that the use of PDT in conjunction with conventional non-surgical periodontal treatment can potentially result in a more effective treatment. Considering the global issue of antibiotic resistance, further development and research in aPDT successes may prove to present it an ideal adjunct to conventional non-surgical periodontal therapy, as compared to the use of systemic antibiotics.

=== Re-examination/Response to Therapy ===
This stage of treatment involves the reassessment of the individual's compliance (i.e. level of oral hygiene) and the tissue response to the treatment. This is carried out 10–12 weeks following RSD. If the disease is stabilised, the treatment progresses on to the maintenance stage. In the case where the disease is not stabilised, the cause of failure should be considered, and the treatment progresses on to the stage of definitive therapy, if the cause is correctable.

=== Definitive Therapy ===
- Further RSD at sites which require treatment
- Use of Locally Delivered Antimicrobials (LDA) as an adjunct to non-surgical periodontal treatment: For use in deep pockets which fail to respond to repeated non-surgical treatment in patients with adequate oral hygiene. Currently, the available LDA include tetracycline, minocycline, chlorhexidine gluconate and doxycycline, with the mode of delivery being in the form of fibers, chips, polymers and trays. There has yet to be much research into the effects of LDA in AgP, but current studies report an insignificant difference to the adjunctive effect of systemic antibiotics.
- Periodontal surgery: If it is a localised problem and if the case is non-response to non-surgical treatment despite the oral hygiene being consistently excellent. This could involve an open flap debridement with or without regenerative procedures, with the aim of gaining access and visibility to root and furcation areas so that a thorough instrumentation and debridement can be carried out.
  - Regenerative surgical therapy currently available include the use of bone replacement grafts, barrier membranes or guided tissue regeneration (GTR), biologic modifiers like growth and differentiation factors (GDF), and extracellular matrix proteins like enamel matrix proteins (EMD). There is however, a great variation in periodontal gains reported in the literature available, signifying that results are not entirely predictable.

=== Maintenance ===
Periodontal treatment may help to stabilise the disease, but it does not change one's susceptibility to the disease. Given the high susceptibility for disease progression of the individual with AgP, there is a higher risk of disease recurrence. It is thus necessary to attend frequent review appointments at the dentist to ensure there is no relapse of the disease, and that the periodontal health is maintained after active periodontal therapy.
