= Hesam Fetrati =

Iranian designer, painter, cartoonist, and conceptual artist

- حسام فطرتی
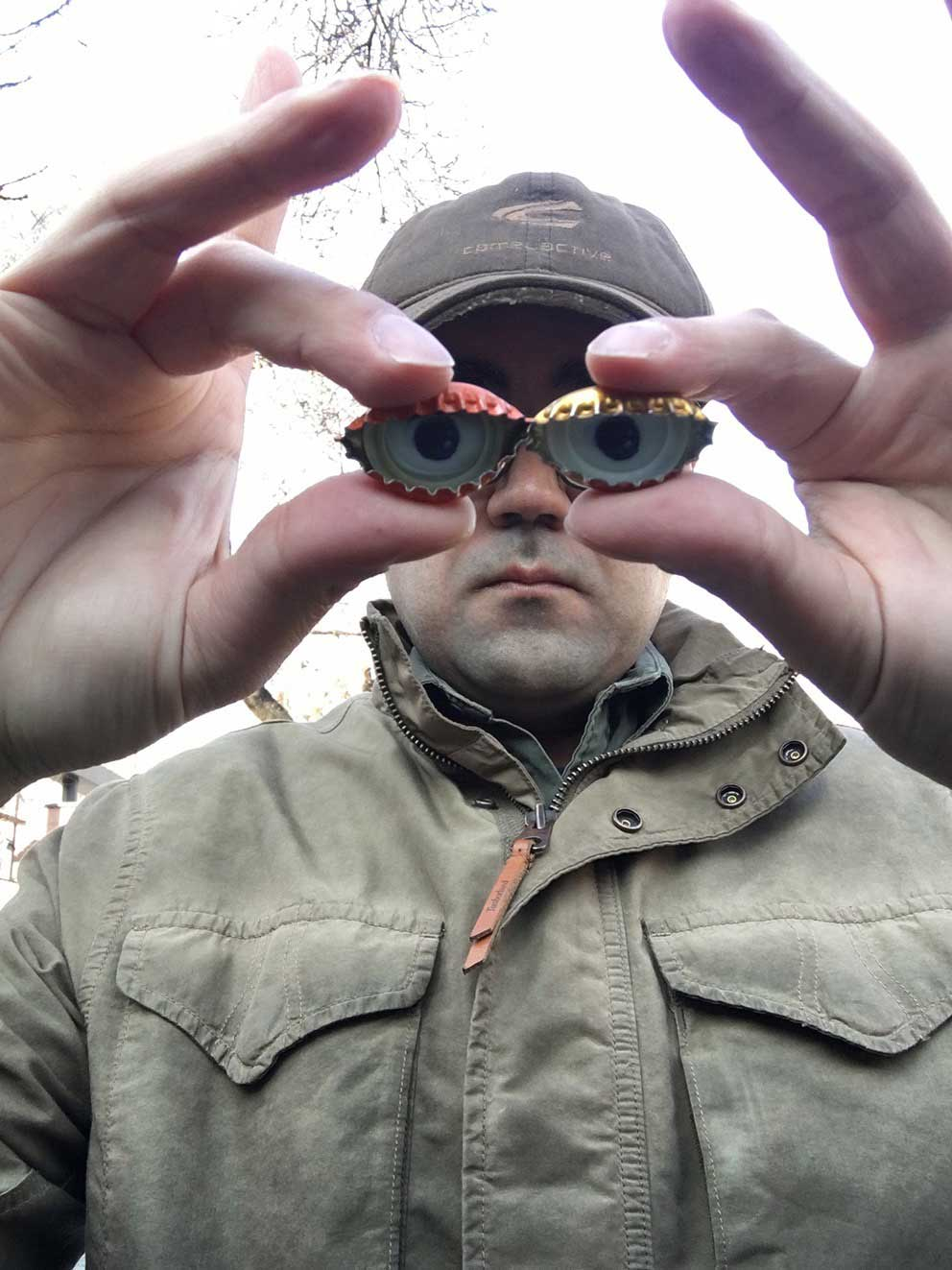
- Born: Tehran, Iran
- Education: Griffith University, Australia
- Known for: Cartoonist, illustrator, Printmaker
- Movement: Conceptual Art
- Website: https://hesamfetrati.com

Signature
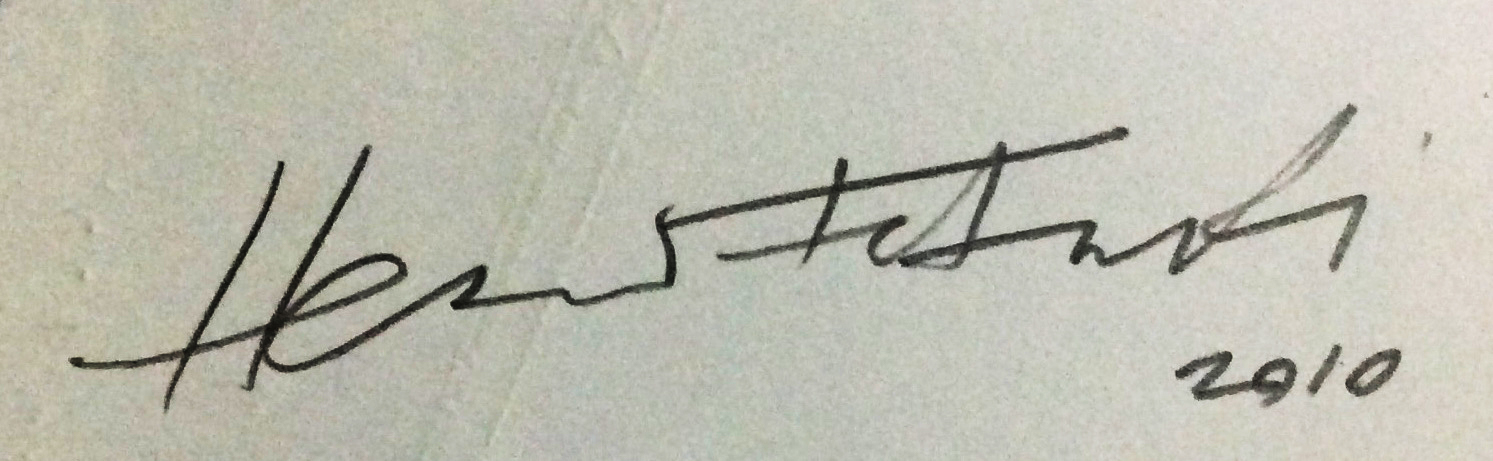

Hesam Fetrati (Persian: حسام فطرتى; born May 6, 1981, in Shemiran) is an Iranian designer, painter, cartoonist, and conceptual artist.

He also has several experiences in curating group shows and conducting academic art research. The issue of immigration is one of the main subjects realised in his works. The book, Every Artist has the Right to Portray the Universal Declaration of Human Rights is a selection of his illustrations published by Mahriz in 2009.

Philosophical ideas and their surrounding issues (i.e. modernism, current life, migration) are the main characteristics of his work which are often narrative and filled with archetypes, symbols, and stereotypes. He has mastered, and favours, classic creative mediums (such as various limited edition prints) with his motivation for adopting this work style being the value of the concept of the "enlightenment", often the foundations of the content and context of his works.

Fetrati has held more than twenty solo exhibitions in different countries, including Iran, the United States, and Australia.

Modernity, modernism in regard to ordinary life, immigration, and ‘tradition reproducing itself’ are some of the themes that interest Fetrati in creating his artworks.

== Education and career ==
After finishing high school, Fetrati completed his bachelor's degree in visual communications and graphic design in Tehran and established his own studio in the early 2000s. During this decade, he worked as a cartoonist and illustrator in Tehran at reformist newspapers and magazines such as Etemad-e Melli, Pou’l, and Tanz-o Caricature. His editorial cartoons in this era are mostly a reflection of the time's political and societal issues with bitter, symbolic, and metaphorical language.

Hesam migrated to Australia in the late 2000s to pursue, and successfully complete, a master's degree and a PhD at Griffith University awarding him two highly competitive scholarships. Fetrati's migration occurred at the same time as the Syrian crisis which had a profound effect on his work due to the forced migration of the many war victims. In four of his collections, Blindness, Severed Roots, There is No North Point and Anticipation, Hesam deals with the issue of migration, aspirations, and hardships. Fetrati spent most of the mid-2010s doing research and academic practice, dedicating part of his doctoral dissertation to researching immigrants and how they adjust to their host community.

== Contents, Philosophy and Visual Elements of His Artworks ==
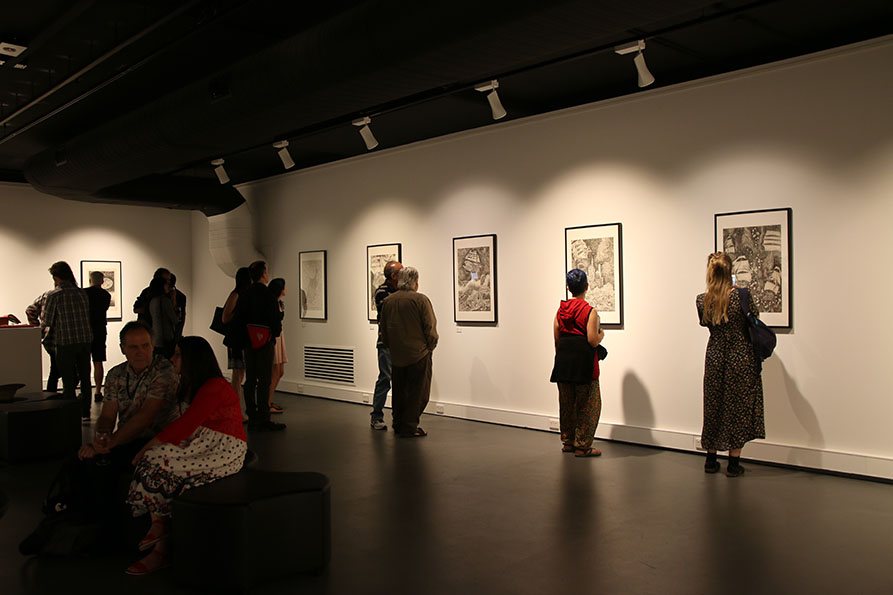
Hesam Fetrati's Exhibition in Australia, Brisbane

One of the recurring subjects referred to in Hesam Fetrati's work is the matter of "enlightenment". The invention and spread of the printing industry were the main inciters of “The Enlightenment” in Europe, which allowed artists and thinkers to share their works and ideas with society via mass production. Relying on the historical tradition of the Enlightenment and its concepts, Fetrati has chosen the hand printing method for most of his works. Hesam uses the techniques of etching, linocut, silkscreen, etc. to create his artworks. One of the unique features of his printed works is their large dimensions; for example, some of his works reach the dimensions of 120 x 240 cm, which may be classified as the largest etching plates (limited edition print) in the world.

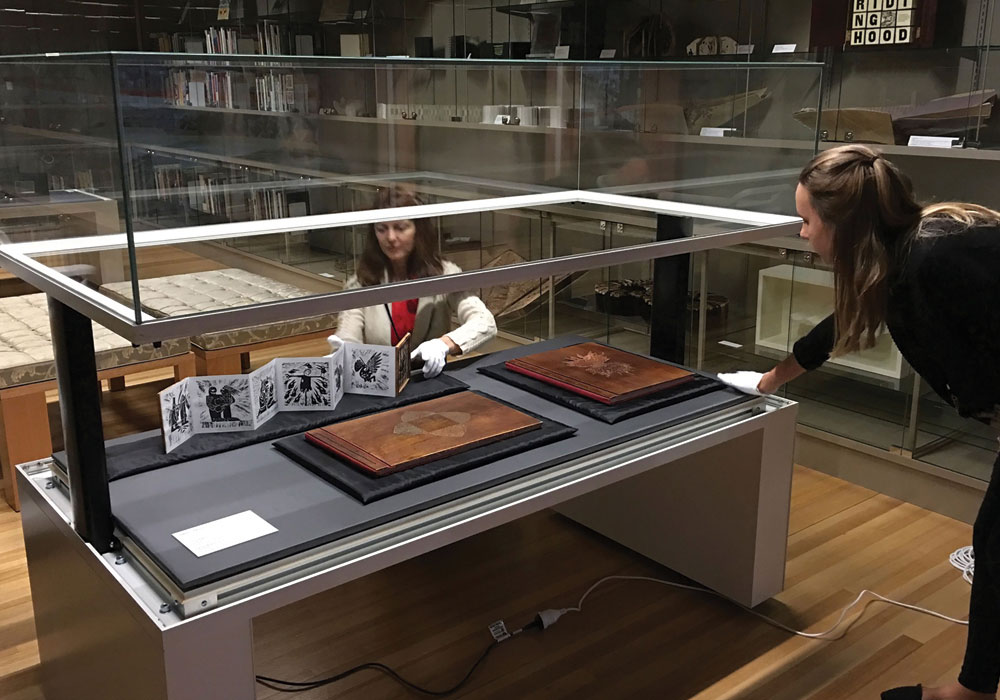
Hesam Fetrati's Artwork in State Library of Queensland

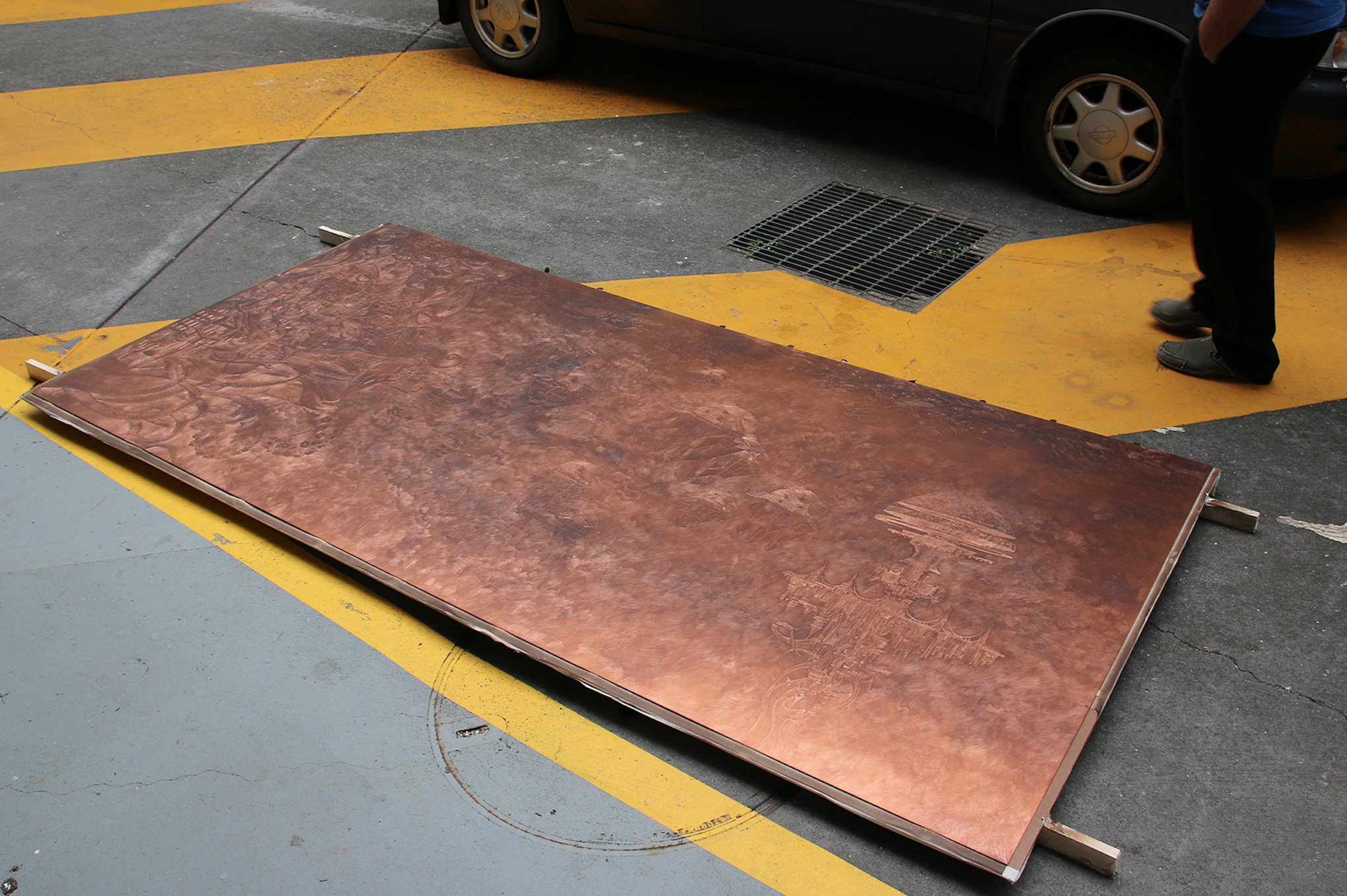
"Dystopia", printmaking, 120 x 240 cm

The concept of enlightenment is the major concept in Fetrati's works. He has reproduced the original work by using the philosophical concept of etching (printing). By using this technique, he has also considered the concept of production while maintaining the originality principles.

== Selected Awards ==
Scholarships and Awards
Award	Year	Country
Marie Ellis OAM/ Runner Up Prize for Drawing	2016	Australia
First prize, AusIran Photography Festival	2013	Australia
GU International Postgraduate Research Scholarship Brisbane	2012	Australia
Griffith University Postgrad Research Scholarship Brisbane	2012	Australia
Special prize, International Visual Art Festival, Niavaran palace	2005	Iran
Special prize, Free Poster Competition	2002	Iran
First prize, Young Iranian Cartoonist	2000	Iran

== Artworks ==
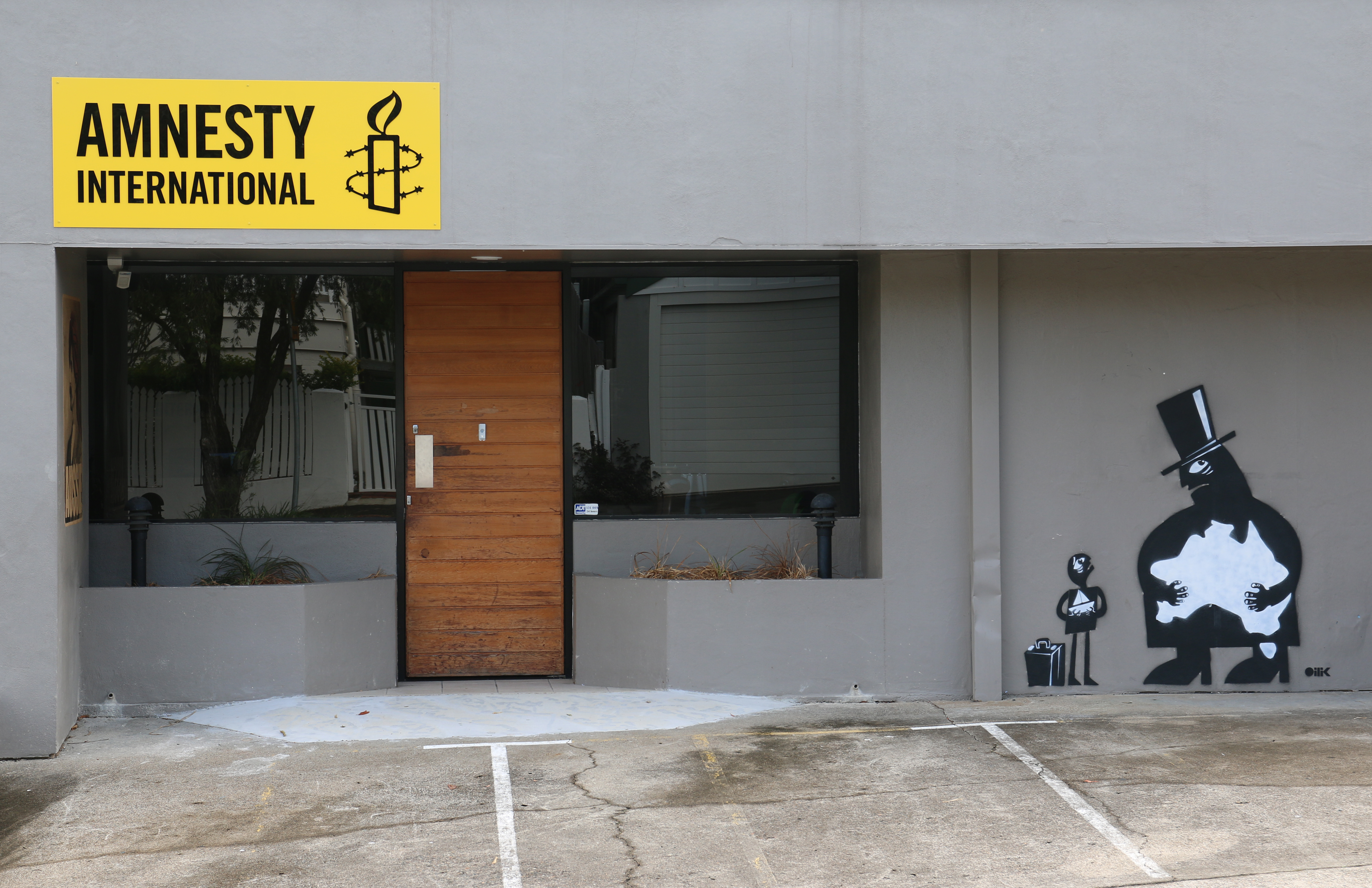
Artwork of Hesam Fetrati for Amnesty International
