= Vada Somerville =

American suffragist (1885–1972)

Vada Watson Somerville
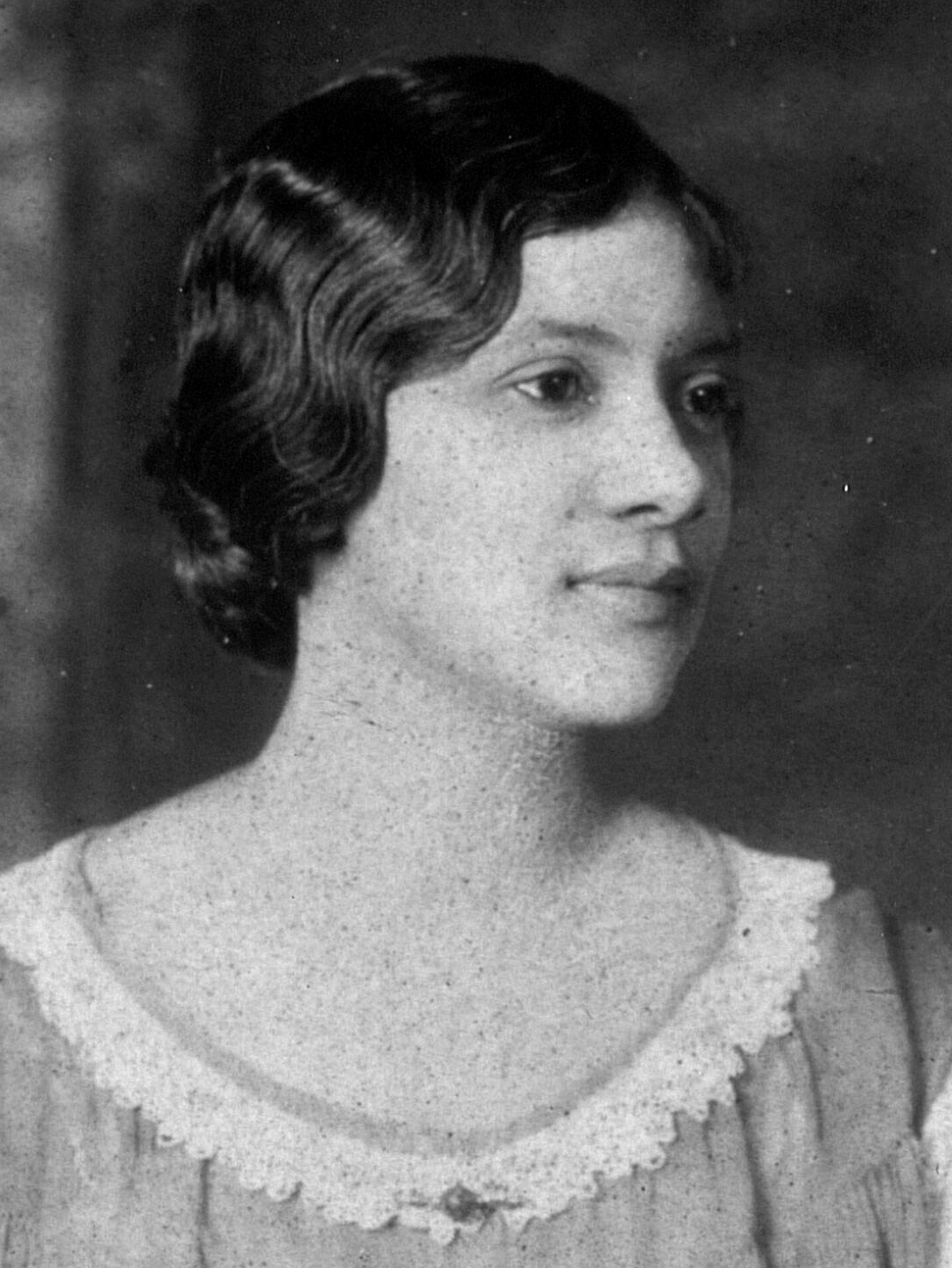
- Vada Somerville in 1912
- Born: November 1, 1885; Pomona, California
- Died: October 28, 1972 (aged 86); Los Angeles, California
- Education: D.D.S., University of Southern California, School of Dentistry, 1918.
- Occupation: Dentist
- Known for: civil rights activist; women in dentistry
- Spouse: John Alexander Somerville (m. 1912)

Vada Watson Somerville, D.D.S. (November 1, 1885 – October 28, 1972) was a civil rights activist and the second African-American woman in California to receive a Doctor of Dental Surgery degree.

== Personal life and family ==
Vada Somerville was born on November 1, 1885, in Pomona, California. Her mother was Dorothy Watson McDonald, a migrant from Arkansas.

== Education ==
In 1903, Somerville received a scholarship through the Los Angeles Times to the University of Southern California (USC).

After graduating from USC, Somerville worked as a book keeper and a telephone operator. In 1912, she married John Alexander Somerville, a Doctor of Dental Surgery who she met while in college. A graduate of the USC School of Dentistry, John Somerville originally planned to return to his native Jamaica to practice dentistry. After their marriage, the couple decided to stay in Los Angeles.

In 1914, the couple founded the NAACP Los Angeles center.

After the United States entered World War I, Vada Somerville decided to become a dentist. She was afraid that her husband would be drafted into the armed forces and lose his patients. When she entered dental school at USC, she was the only woman and the only African American in her class.

In 1918, Somerville graduated with her D.D.S., the second African-American women to finish the USC dental program. She then became the first black woman to be licensed to practice dentistry in the state of California with one of the highest scores. She retired from dentistry in 1933.

== Career ==
After retiring from dentistry in 1933, Somerville devoted herself to civil rights activism and participation in many community organizations. She made the decision to devote herself full-time to "social welfare and civic work." some of which are the Los Angeles League of Women Voters, the Council on Public Affairs, UCLA's YWCA and the USC Half Century Club.

In 1927, the Somervilles broke ground for the Hotel Somerville in Los Angeles. It was described in Black Women in America as "an elegant, all-Black hostelry that symbolized both the possibilities of racial advancement and the realities of racial segregation." This hotel became a gathering place for those African Americans who wanted social change as well as an example of how the educated black class was beginning to contribute new status and ideas into the discussion of race in America. In 1928, the Hotel Somerville served as the headquarters for the NAACP national convention. After the stock market crashed and the hotel was bought from the Somervilles, the Hotel Somerville was renamed the Dunbar Hotel and soon after it became a museum with local and national landmark status.

By 1938, Vada had become an active member in the establishment of the Los Angeles chapter of the National Council of Negro Women. In 1948, Vada helped to co-found the Los Angeles County Human Relations Committee and established the Pilgrim House Community Center designed to take care of the health needs of black families who migrated to LA during World War II. Vada's support of black women was crucial to the creation of black women's service organizations such as the Links and the Alpha Kappa Alpha sorority. One of her final accomplishments was her creation of The Stevens House, a multiracial dormitory at UCLA made to foster better interracial relations between students. UCLA sold and closed The Stevens House in 1992. Profits were donated to the UCLA Foundation to establish The Stevens House Scholarship, to be awarded annually in the form of scholarships with priority given to undergraduate underrepresented students with financial need and academic potential.

== Legacy ==
Vada Somerville died on October 28, 1972, in Los Angeles, California.

Both John and Vada Somerville are revered at the USC Dental School, where their portraits are hanging as symbols of ambition and perseverance. Additionally, USC's African-American residential theme floor has been named Somerville Place, after John and Vada Somerville. It has gained national recognition by being featured in the Los Angeles newspaper in 2000. The goal of Somerville Place is to foster a respect for black culture and create a sense of community on campus. However, Vada's legacy extended beyond her accomplishments at USC. The civil rights movement, including the Brown v. Board of Education decision and Rosa Parks's legacy, became a reality in large part due to the efforts of Vada Somerville and other women like her across the country. By the time Vada died, she had turned her own personal accomplishment into a social revolution for women across the country.
