= Hessam Abrishami =

Iranian artist

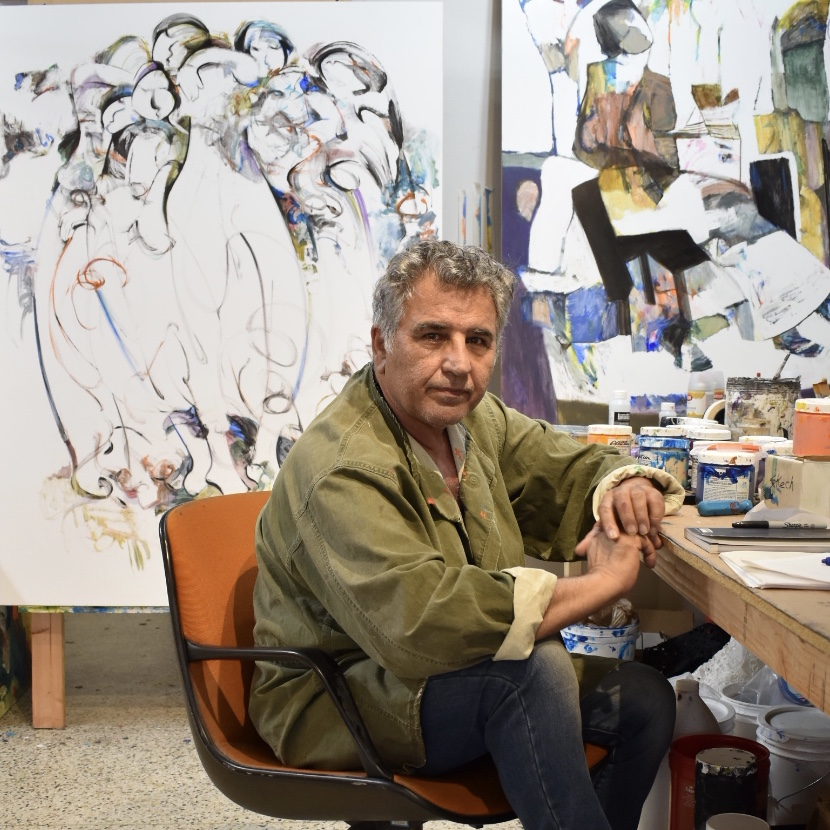
Hessam Abrishami (2020)

Hessam Abrishami (Persian: حسام ابریشمی, born 1951) is an Iranian-born American artist, he works in multiple media including painting and sculpture. He currently lives in Miami, Florida; and has previously lived in Los Angeles, California; Perugia, Italy; and Shiraz, Iran.

== Biography ==
Hessam Abrishami was born December 30, 1951, in Shiraz, Iran. He grew up in a middle class family, and was one of 8 children. He started painting at age 15, attending college to study art in Iran. Abrishami continued his studies and attended the Accademia di Belle Arti di Perugia in Italy, where he received a master's degree. In 1984, he moved to the United States.

Abrishami frequently works in acrylic painting and bronze sculpture, making abstract work. Themes of his work include love, romanticism and self realization. He has exhibited in more than 30 countries internationally, including in Europe and Asia.

== Publications ==
- Abrishami, Hessam; Daneshvari, Abbas (1998). The Black Apple: The Paintings of Hessam Abrishami, a Retrospective. Collectors Editions. ISBN 9781885320025.
- Abrishami, Hessam; Metcalf, W. Joseph (2005). Expressions of Love: The Paintings of Hessam Abrishami, a Retrospective. Farbod Sadjadi (contributor). Studio Fine Art. ISBN 9780977010905.
