= Artificial saliva =

Synthetically produced liquid that mimics saliva

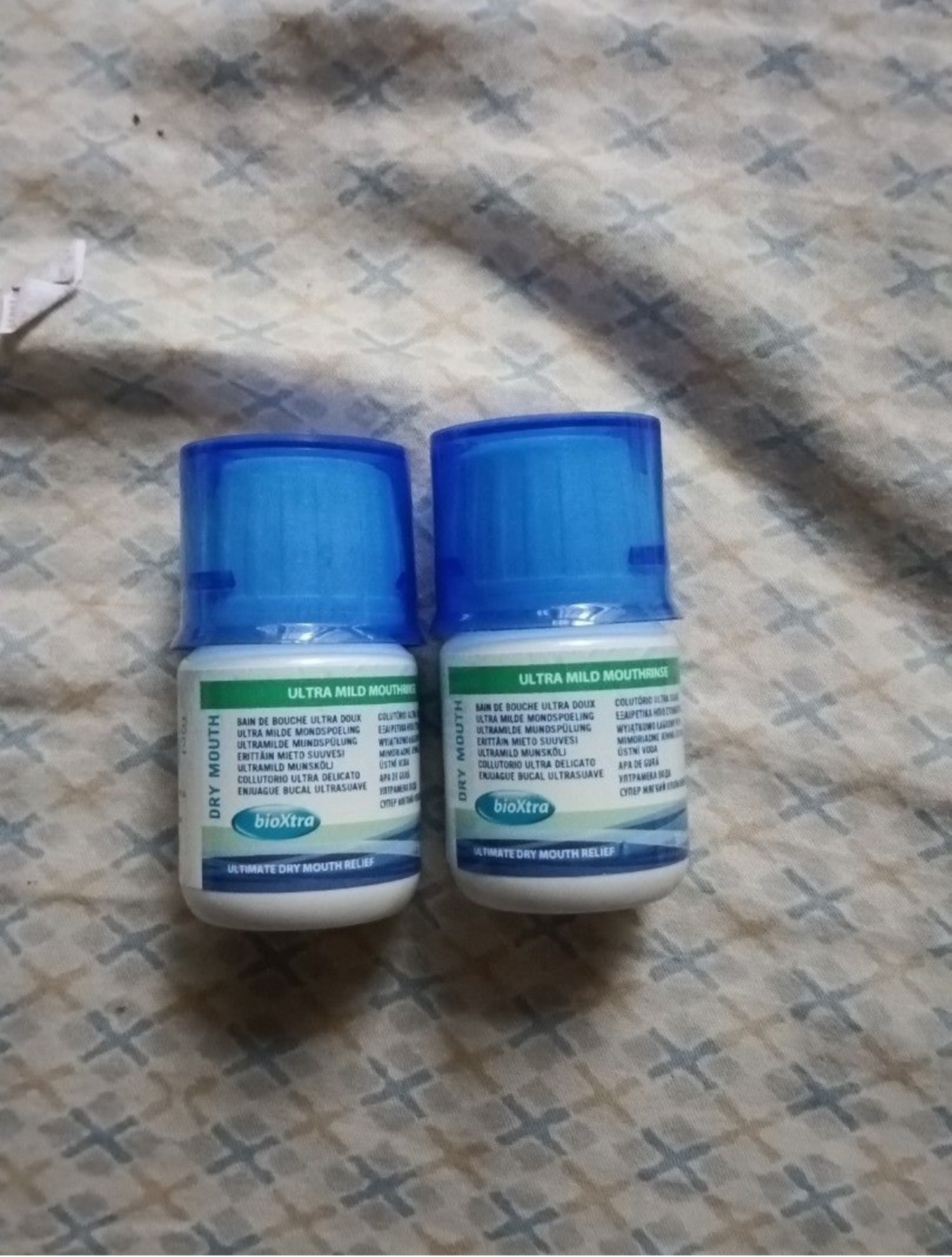
Artificial saliva for dry mouth in a mouthwash form

Artificial saliva, or a salivary substitute, refers to a synthetically produced liquid that mimics the natural secretion of saliva. It is designed as a symptomatic relief for xerostomia, a condition characterised by dryness in the mouth and is available over-the-counter. The efficacy of artificial saliva in a systematic review of clinical trials indicates that all evaluated products reduce xerostomia symptoms, but the comparative effectiveness remains unclear due to study inconsistencies and potential biases. Side effects are uncommon, but users should take precautions against possible side effects such as allergic reactions.

Artificial saliva is mainly composed of bioactive compounds, which substitute for natural saliva's biological functions, such as facilitating antimicrobial activity, digestion and lubrication of oral tissues. Additional components such as buffering and flavouring agents are added to increase the stability of formulations and user acceptance, respectively. These formulations are available in various forms and have varied chemical-physical properties.

Current research on artificial saliva focuses on expanding its functionality by incorporating synthetic molecules similar to their biological counterparts in natural saliva. The study includes efforts to enhance native salivary proteins and synthesise novel molecules using various chemical and genetic engineering techniques.

== Clinical applications ==
Artificial saliva is primarily used to relieve symptoms of xerostomia, known as dry mouth and hyposalivation, which is a condition that results in reduced saliva production. Various factors, including medication use, cancer therapy, and certain diseases, such as diabetes, stroke or Sjögren syndrome, can cause xerostomia. Artificial saliva supplements any pre-existing saliva in individuals with xerostomia, and its primary function is to restore moisture in the oral cavity. Artificial saliva is available over-the-counter and comes in various formulations, including gels, mouth rinses and sprays.

Artificial saliva also contributes to oral health maintenance by promoting enamel defence against acidic erosion. In individuals with a high intake of soft drinks or a high vomiting frequency and a decrease in saliva flow, artificial saliva can help improve the clearance time of acids and reduce the chance of dental erosion.

== Efficacy ==
The assessment of artificial saliva's efficacy reveals a consensus that all evaluated products contribute to reducing xerostomia symptoms in a systematic review of clinical trials. The review indicated that herbal products are better than artificial saliva in alleviating symptoms of radiation-induced xerostomia, while oral spray presentation and saliva substitutes containing 3% citric acid provide longer-lasting relief for drug-induced xerostomia. The selection and combination of saliva substitutes should be tailored to the individual's needs, preferences and oral health status. Despite the variety of products tested, a definitive judgment on their comparative effectiveness is challenging due to the heterogeneity of the studies in terms of the products, sites and durations involved and many studies exhibit a high risk of bias.

== Side effects ==
Side effects of artificial saliva are relatively uncommon but still exist with varying severity. Minor side effects might not necessitate medical attention. However, in certain instances, users may experience symptoms indicative of an allergic reaction, such as rash, hives, itching, and swelling in the mouth, face, lips, tongue or throat and should consult a doctor. Common side effects include:

- Speech disturbance
- Distortion in taste (dysgeusia)
- Difficulty in swallowing (dysphagia)
- Minor gastrointestinal problems

== Warnings ==
Individuals with fructose intolerance should be aware that certain artificial saliva products contain fructose and should be avoided. Users adhering to a sodium-restricted diet must exercise caution when selecting an artificial saliva product, as some, including Caphosol, may contain considerable amounts of sodium.

== Composition ==
Artificial saliva comprises an array of bioactive compounds designed to mimic the natural functions of human saliva to alleviate symptoms of dry mouth by aiding in speaking and swallowing, and it provides general comfort by simulating the sticky consistency of natural saliva. The composition typically includes cellulose derivatives, buffering and flavouring agents as core components, ensuring the product's efficacy and palatability.

=== Cellulose derivatives ===
Cellulose derivatives are rheological modifiers, which are compounds responsible for the viscosity and texture of artificial saliva, enabling it to adhere to oral tissues and provide a protective and lubricating film. The viscosity of cellulose derivatives is greater than that of natural human saliva. Cellulose derivatives include:

- Carboxymethyl cellulose
- Hydroxyethyl cellulose
- Hydroxypropyl methylcellulose

=== Mucin ===
Mucin is a glycoprotein prevalent in natural saliva, and lab-made mucin can closely replicate the characteristics of natural saliva by forming a protective and lubricative film on oral surfaces. Mucin has an elevated adsorption capacity compared to carboxymethyl cellulose-based formulations, which improves lubrication. Clinical trials have indicated a preference among users for saliva substitutes containing mucin compared to those formulated with carboxymethyl cellulose.

=== Glycerol ===
Glycerol is a colourless and odourless lipid and can coat oral surfaces. It aids in humidifying and lubricating the oral cavity, easing discomfort associated with dry mouth conditions. Glycerol is a Newtonian fluid with a higher viscosity than natural human saliva.

=== Enzymes ===
Enzymes in artificial saliva mimic natural saliva's antimicrobial and digestive functions by contributing to the breakdown of food particles and inhibiting the growth of harmful bacteria, which improves oral health and assists in the digestive process. Enzymes include:

- Lysozyme
- Lactoferrin
- Peroxidase

=== Minerals ===
Minerals contribute to dental integrity and serve a protective function in the oral environment. The minerals aid in the remineralisation process, which repairs tooth enamel that might have been demineralised due to various oral conditions or acidic environments. For example, fluoride forms fluorapatite, a compound more resistant to decay than the original hydroxyapatite of the tooth enamel. Minerals include:

- Calcium
- Phosphate
- Fluoride

=== Buffering agents ===
Buffering agents in artificial saliva maintain the pH levels, ensuring the oral environment remains within the optimal range for enamel protection and microbial balance. A stable pH prevents tooth decay and maintains oral health. These buffering agents neutralise acidic substances in the oral cavity, safeguarding tooth enamel and soft tissues from acid-related damage. Buffering agents include:

- Sodium phosphate
- Potassium phosphate

=== Flavouring agents ===
Flavouring agents enhance the taste and acceptability of artificial saliva. These agents can mask any unpleasant flavours inherent in the other components and make the user's experience of using artificial saliva more pleasant. Flavouring agents encourage the user's compliance with the treatment regimen, mainly when long-term use is necessary. Flavouring agents include:

- Xylitol
- Sorbitol
- Citric acid

== Types ==
Artificial saliva is available in different types and varies in chemical-physical properties, including viscosity, pH, buffering capacity, superficial tension, density and spinnbarkeit. Types of artificial saliva include:

- Oral liquid
- Oral spray
- Lozenge
- Gel
- Oil
- Mouthwash
- Toothpaste

== Research ==
Research on artificial saliva focuses on replicating the biological components of natural saliva to substitute and enhance essential functions such as aiding digestion, performing antimicrobial action and protecting tissue layers. Approaches include enhancing or mimicking salivary proteins in natural saliva.

=== Enhancing salivary proteins ===
Salivary proteins such as histatin, statherin and mucin, which possess antimicrobial, lubrication and biomineralisation properties, are targets of enhancement in artificial saliva research as they are significant in maintaining oral health.

Genetic engineering and recombinant DNA techniques produce recombinant salivary proteins for enhanced biological functions. Identification of recombinant histatin and statherin strains is more prevalent as they are smaller and simpler in structure. Therefore, a range of histatin and statherin variants with duplication of active protein domain or removal of phosphorylated serine that enhances antimicrobial activities and enamel biomineralisation were developed and produced.

Recombinant mucins were less widely produced previously due to challenges imposed by the repetitive nature of their DNA sequences, which often results in highly truncated, suboptimal protein production. Substantial research was devoted to developing custom gene synthesis methods to overcome these challenges. The methods were guided by codon scrambling algorithms to reduce repetition in DNA sequences while conserving important information for recombinant protein synthesis.

The downstream genetic expression system of recombinant salivary proteins is also a key area of research, as it affects glycosylation patterns that contribute to their stability and lubrication properties. Efficient modification of glycosylation genes in host cells through genetic engineering techniques like CRISPR/Cas9 to produce salivary proteins with specific glycan phenotypes, which enhance the stability of artificial saliva.

=== Synthesising novel molecules ===
Synthesising novel molecules that mimic natural salivary proteins' complete or partial structure is a key aspect of artificial saliva research.

Fully synthesised molecules from a chemical engineering approach include mirror-image mucins and thio-mucins, produced from monomers incorporated with enantiomer amino acids and modified glycan linkages, respectively. These structural analogs have tunable biodegradation rates while maintaining their ability to bind with salivary proteins, thus improving artificial saliva's stability and lubrication properties.

Another class of novel molecules developed from a genetic engineering approach to mimic salivary proteins are recombinant supercharged polypeptides (SUPs). They are produced from the construction of new DNA sequences that express SUPs consisting of repetitive units encoding for glycine (G), valine (V), proline (P), and lysine (K) amino acids. This polypeptide class has increased interaction with the layering of salivary conditioning films (SCFs) coating oral tissues, which helps improve oral lubrication.

Novel molecules developed to mimic partial structures of salivary proteins include chemically modified O-glycans, using methods such as direct oxidation and metabolic glycoengineering. The modified O-glycans facilitate mucin conjugation with other molecules in the oral cavity for enhanced physical properties and bioactivity.
