= CRTX =

CRTX may refer to:

- crtX, the gene for the enzyme zeaxanthin glucosyltransferase
- Chemoradiotherapy, the combination of chemotherapy and radiotherapy to treat cancer
- Cortexyme, a biopharmaceutical company working on developing treatments for neurodegenerative diseases
- .crtx, a file extension
