= RI-1 =

RI-1 may refer to:

- Rhode Island's 1st congressional district
- RI-1 (chemical), an experimental oncology drug
- U.S. Route 1 in Rhode Island, a portion of a north–south highway in the United States
