= Nibrozetone =

Clinical data
- Other names: Rrx-001

Identifiers
- IUPAC name: 2-bromo-1-(3,3-dinitroazetidin-1-yl)ethanone
- CAS Number: 925206-65-1
- PubChem CID: 15950826
- DrugBank: DB12060
- ChemSpider: 13092644
- UNII: 7RPW6SU9SC
- KEGG: D12720
- ChEMBL: ChEMBL3526802

Chemical and physical data
- Formula: C_{5}H_{6}BrN_{3}O_{5}
- Molar mass: 268.023 g·mol^{−1}
- 3D model (JSmol): Interactive image
- SMILES: C1C(CN1C(=O)CBr)([N+](=O)[O-])[N+](=O)[O-]
- InChI: InChI=InChI=1S/C5H6BrN3O5/c6-1-4(10)7-2-5(3-7,8(11)12)9(13)14/h1-3H2; Key:JODKFOVZURLVTG-UHFFFAOYSA-N

Nibrozetone is an investigational new drug that is being evaluated by EpicentRx for the treatment of oral mucositis in head and neck cancer patients. It is a small molecule that combines direct inhibition of the NLRP3 inflammasome, induction of NRF2, and release of nitric oxide under hypoxic conditions. It has received Fast Track designation from the FDA for severe oral mucositis in head and neck cancer patients.
