= Cancer treatment =

Treatment of cancer
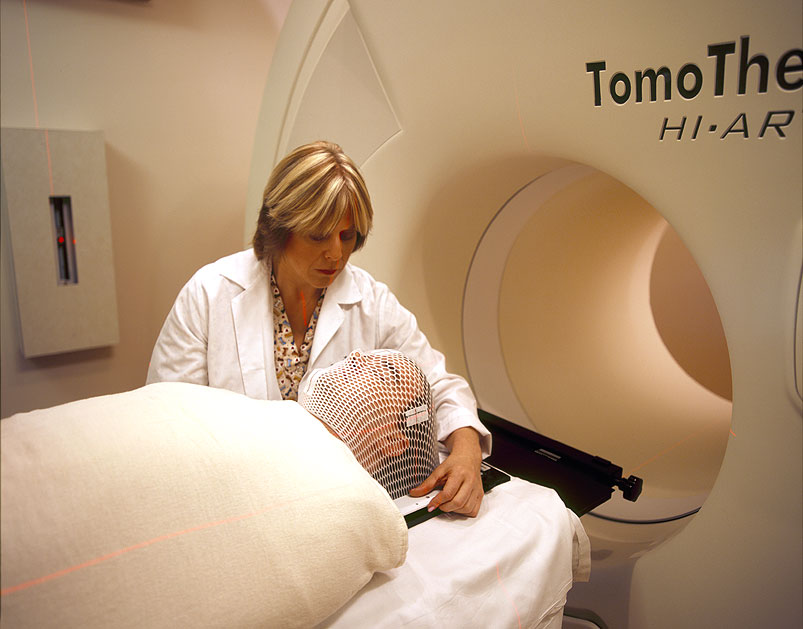
- A patient prepared for radiation therapy
- Specialty: Oncology
- ICD-10-PCS: 110000053

Cancer treatments are a wide range of treatments available for the many different types of cancer, with each cancer type needing its own specific treatment. Treatments can include surgery, chemotherapy, radiation therapy, hormonal therapy, targeted therapy including small-molecule drugs or monoclonal antibodies, and PARP inhibitors such as olaparib. Other therapies include hyperthermia, immunotherapy, photodynamic therapy, and stem-cell therapy. Most commonly cancer treatment involves a series of separate therapies such as chemotherapy before surgery. Angiogenesis inhibitors are sometimes used to enhance the effects of immunotherapies.

The choice of therapy depends upon the location and grade of the tumor and the stage of the disease, as well as the general state of the patient. Biomarker testing can help to determine the type of cancer, and indicate the best therapy. A number of experimental cancer treatments are continuously under development. In 2023 it was estimated that one in five people will be diagnosed with cancer at some point in their lifetime.

The primary goal of cancer treatment is to either cure the cancer by its complete removal, or to considerably prolong the life of the individual. Palliative care is involved when the prognosis is poor and the cancer termed as terminal. There are many types of cancer, and many of these can be successfully treated if detected early enough.

== Types of treatments ==
The treatment of cancer has undergone evolutionary changes as understanding of the underlying biological processes has increased. Tumor removal surgeries have been documented in ancient Egypt, hormone therapy and radiation therapy were developed in the late 19th century. Chemotherapy, immunotherapy and newer targeted therapies are products of the 20th century. As new information about the biology of cancer emerges, treatments will be developed and modified to increase effectiveness, precision, survivability, and quality of life.

=== Surgery ===
Malignant tumours can be cured if entirely removed by surgery. But if the cancer has already spread (metastasized) to other sites, complete surgical excision is usually impossible. In the Halstedian model of cancer progression, tumors grow locally, then spread to the lymph nodes, then to the rest of the body. This has given rise to the popularity of local-only treatments such as surgery for small cancers. Even small localized tumors are increasingly recognized as possessing metastatic potential.

Examples of surgical procedures for cancer include mastectomy, and lumpectomy for breast cancer, prostatectomy for prostate cancer, and lung cancer surgery for non-small cell lung cancer. The goal of the surgery can be either the removal of only the tumor, the entire organ, or part of the organ. A single cancer cell is invisible to the naked eye but can regrow into a new tumor, a process called recurrence. For this reason, the pathologist will examine the surgical specimen to determine if a margin of healthy tissue is present, thus decreasing the chance that microscopic cancer cells are left in the patient.

In addition to removal of the primary tumor, surgery is often necessary for staging, e.g. determining the extent of the disease and whether it has metastasized to regional lymph nodes. Staging is a major determinant of prognosis and of the need for adjuvant therapy. Occasionally, surgery is necessary to control symptoms, such as spinal cord compression or bowel obstruction. This is referred to as palliative treatment.

Surgery may be performed before or after other forms of treatment. Treatment before surgery is often described as neoadjuvant. In breast cancer, the survival rate of patients who receive neoadjuvant chemotherapy are no different from those who are treated following surgery. Giving chemotherapy earlier allows oncologists to evaluate the effectiveness of the therapy, and may make removal of the tumor easier. However, the survival advantages of neoadjuvant treatment in lung cancer are less clear.

=== Radiation therapy ===
Radiation therapy (radiotherapy) is the use of ionizing radiation to kill cancer cells and shrink tumors by damaging their DNA causing cellular death. Radiation therapy can either damage DNA directly or create charged particles (free radicals) within the cells that can in turn damage the DNA. Radiation therapy can be administered externally via external beam radiotherapy or internally via brachytherapy. The effects of radiation therapy are localised and confined to the region being treated. Although radiation damages both cancer cells and normal cells, most normal cells can recover from the effects of radiation and function properly. The goal of radiation therapy is to damage as many cancer cells as possible, while limiting harm to nearby healthy tissue. Hence, it is given in many fractions, allowing healthy tissue to recover between fractions.

Radiation therapy may be used to treat almost every type of solid tumor, and may also be used to treat leukemia and lymphoma. The radiation dose to each site depends on a number of factors, including the radio sensitivity of each cancer type and whether there are tissues and organs nearby that may be damaged by radiation. Thus, as with every form of treatment, radiation therapy is not without its side effects.

Radiation therapy can lead to dry mouth from exposure of salivary glands to radiation, resulting in decreased saliva secretion. Post therapy, the salivary glands will resume functioning but rarely in the same fashion. Dry mouth caused by radiation can be a permanent problem.

=== Chemotherapy ===
Chemotherapy is the treatment of cancer with drugs ("anticancer drugs") that can destroy cancer cells. Chemotherapy can be given in a variety of ways such as injections into the muscles, skin, artery, or vein, or it can be taken by mouth in the form of a pill. In current usage, the term "chemotherapy" usually refers to cytotoxic drugs which affect rapidly dividing cells in general, in contrast with targeted therapy (see below). Chemotherapy drugs interfere with cell division in various possible ways, e.g. with the duplication of DNA or the separation of newly formed chromosomes. Most forms of chemotherapy target all rapidly dividing cells and are not specific to cancer cells, although some degree of specificity may come from the inability of many cancer cells to repair DNA damage, while normal cells generally can. Hence, chemotherapy has the potential to harm healthy tissue, especially those tissues that have a high replacement rate (e.g. intestinal lining). These cells usually repair themselves after chemotherapy.

Because some drugs work better together than alone, two or more drugs are often given at the same time. This is called "combination chemotherapy"; most chemotherapy regimens are given in a combination.

Since chemotherapy affects the whole body, it can have a wide range of side effects. Patients often find that they start losing their hair since the drugs that are combatting the cancer cells also attack the cells in the hair roots. This powerful treatment can also lead to fatigue, loss of appetite, and vomiting depending on the person.

The treatment of some leukaemias and lymphomas requires the use of high-dose chemotherapy, and total body irradiation (TBI). This treatment ablates the bone marrow, and hence the body's ability to recover and repopulate the blood. For this reason, bone marrow, or peripheral blood stem cell harvesting is carried out before the ablative part of the therapy, to enable "rescue" after the treatment has been given. This is known as autologous stem cell transplantation.

=== Targeted therapies ===
Targeted therapy, which first became available in the late 1990s, has had a significant impact in the treatment of some types of cancer, and is a very active research area. This constitutes the use of agents specific for the deregulated proteins of cancer cells. Small molecule drugs are targeted therapy drugs that are generally inhibitors of enzymatic domains on mutated, overexpressed, or otherwise critical proteins within the cancer cell. Prominent examples are the tyrosine kinase inhibitors imatinib (Gleevec/Glivec) and gefitinib (Iressa).

Monoclonal antibody therapy is another strategy in which the therapeutic agent is an antibody which specifically binds to a protein on the surface of the cancer cells. Examples include the anti-HER2/neu antibody trastuzumab (Herceptin) used in breast cancer, and the anti-CD20 antibody rituximab, used in a variety of B-cell malignancies.

Targeted therapy can also involve small peptides as "homing devices" which can bind to cell surface receptors or affected extracellular matrix surrounding the tumor. Radionuclides which are attached to these peptides (e.g. RGDs) eventually kill the cancer cell if the nuclide decays in the vicinity of the cell. Especially oligo- or multimers of these binding motifs are of great interest, since this can lead to enhanced tumor specificity and avidity.

Photodynamic therapy (PDT) is a ternary treatment for cancer involving a photosensitizer, tissue oxygen, and light (often using lasers). PDT can be used as treatment for basal cell carcinoma (BCC) or lung cancer; PDT can also be useful in removing traces of malignant tissue after surgical removal of large tumors. In February 2019, medical scientists announced that iridium attached to albumin, creating a photosensitized molecule, can penetrate cancer cells and, after being irradiated with light, destroy the cancer cells.

High-energy therapeutic ultrasound could increase higher-density anti-cancer drug load and nanomedicines to target tumor sites by 20x fold higher than traditional target cancer therapy.

Targeted therapies under pre-clinical development as potential cancer treatments include morpholino splice switching oligonucleotides, which induce ERG exon skipping in prostate cancer models, multitargeted kinase inhibitors that inhibit the PI3K with other pathways including MEK and PIM, and inhibitors of NF-κB in models of chemotherapy resistance.

Another approach to targeted therapy involves simultaneously targeting multiple genes implicated in cancer development. For example, concurrent targeting of Integrin β3 and IGF-1R genes in breast cancer has demonstrated significant downregulation of both genes in vitro, as well as induction of programmed cell death (apoptosis) in cancer cells.

A systematic review published in the U.K. Cochrane database found that targeted therapies significantly improve progression-free survival by 35 to 40% in metastatic or relapsed cancer. While the research points to promising clinical outcomes, there is still limited evidence on the long-term effects of targeted therapies in terms of overall survival, quality of life, and severe adverse events.

=== Immunotherapy ===
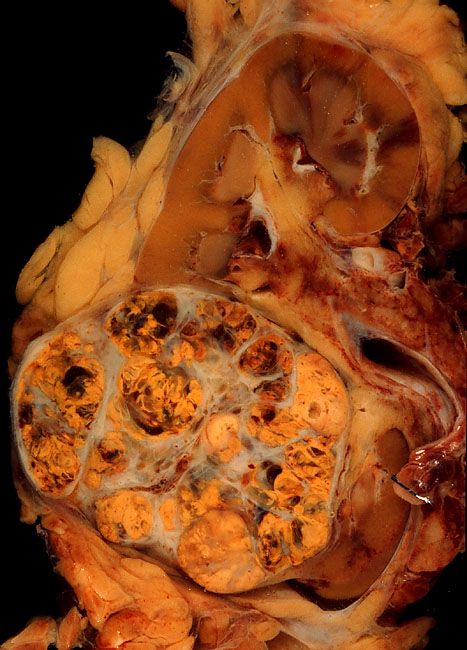
A renal cell carcinoma (lower left) in a kidney

Cancer immunotherapy refers to a diverse set of therapeutic strategies designed to induce the patient's own immune system to fight the tumor. Contemporary methods for generating an immune response against tumors include intravesical BCG immunotherapy for superficial bladder cancer, and use of interferons and other cytokines to induce an immune response in renal cell carcinoma and melanoma patients. Cancer vaccines to generate specific immune responses are the subject of intensive research for a number of tumors, notably melanoma and renal cell carcinoma. Sipuleucel-T is a vaccine-like strategy for prostate cancer in which dendritic cells from the patient are loaded with prostatic acid phosphatase peptides to induce a specific immune response against prostate-derived cells. It gained FDA approval in 2010.

Allogeneic hematopoietic stem cell transplantation (HSCT), usually from the bone marrow, from a genetically non-identical donor can be considered a form of immunotherapy, since the donor's immune cells will often attack the tumor in a phenomenon known as graft-versus-tumor effect. For this reason, allogeneic HSCT leads to a higher cure rate than autologous transplantation for several cancer types, although the side effects are also more severe.

The cell based immunotherapy in which the patients own natural killer cells (NKs) and cytotoxic T cells are used has been in practice in Japan since 1990. NK cells and T cells primarily kill the cancer cells when they are developed. This treatment is given together with the other modes of treatment such as surgery, radiotherapy or chemotherapy and termed autologous immune enhancement therapy (AIET).

Immune checkpoint therapy focuses on two immune checkpoint proteins, cytotoxic T-lymphocyte associated protein 4 (CTLA-4) and programmed cell death protein 1 (PD-1). Under normal conditions, the immune system uses checkpoint proteins as negative feedback mechanisms to return to homeostasis once pathogens have been cleared from the body. In a tumor microenvironment, cancer cells can commandeer this physiological regulatory system to "put a brake" on the anti-cancer immune response and evade immune surveillance. The 2018 Nobel Prize in medicine was awarded to Dr. James Allison of University of Texas MD Anderson Cancer Center in U.S. and Dr. Tasuku Honjo Kyoto University in Japan for their contributions in advance of PD-1 and CTLA-4 immune checkpoint therapy.

=== Hormonal therapy ===
The growth of some cancers can be inhibited by providing or blocking certain hormones. Common examples of hormone-sensitive tumors include certain types of breast and prostate cancers. Blocking estrogen or testosterone is often an important additional treatment. In certain cancers, administration of hormone agonists, such as progestogens may be therapeutically beneficial. Although the side effects from hormone therapy vary depending on the type, patients can experience symptoms such as hot flashes, nausea, and fatigue.

=== Angiogenesis inhibitors ===
Angiogenesis inhibitors prevent the extensive growth of blood vessels (angiogenesis) that tumors need to survive and grow. Continued growth allows the invasion of cells into neighbouring tissues, and metastasis into distal tissues. There are many approved angiogenesis inhibitors including bevacizumab, axitinib, and cabozantinib.

Flavonoids have been shown to downregulate the angiogenic stimulation of VEGF and Hypoxia-inducible factor (HIF) but none have reached clinical trials.

=== Exercise prescription ===
Exercise prescription is becoming a mainstream adjunct treatment for cancer, based on studies which show that exercise (compared to no exercise) is associated with reduced recurrence rates, improved mortality outcomes, reduction of side effects from traditional cancer treatments. Although it is uncertain whether improved outcomes with exercise are correlated or causative, the benefit-risk ratio of including exercise as part of cancer treatment is large, as exercise has further benefits (e.g. cardiovascular, mental health) without major risks, although there is a small risk of overuse injury if added too aggressively. Exercise physiologists and exercise medicine specialists can assist oncologists and primary care practitioners with exercise prescription in cancer patients.

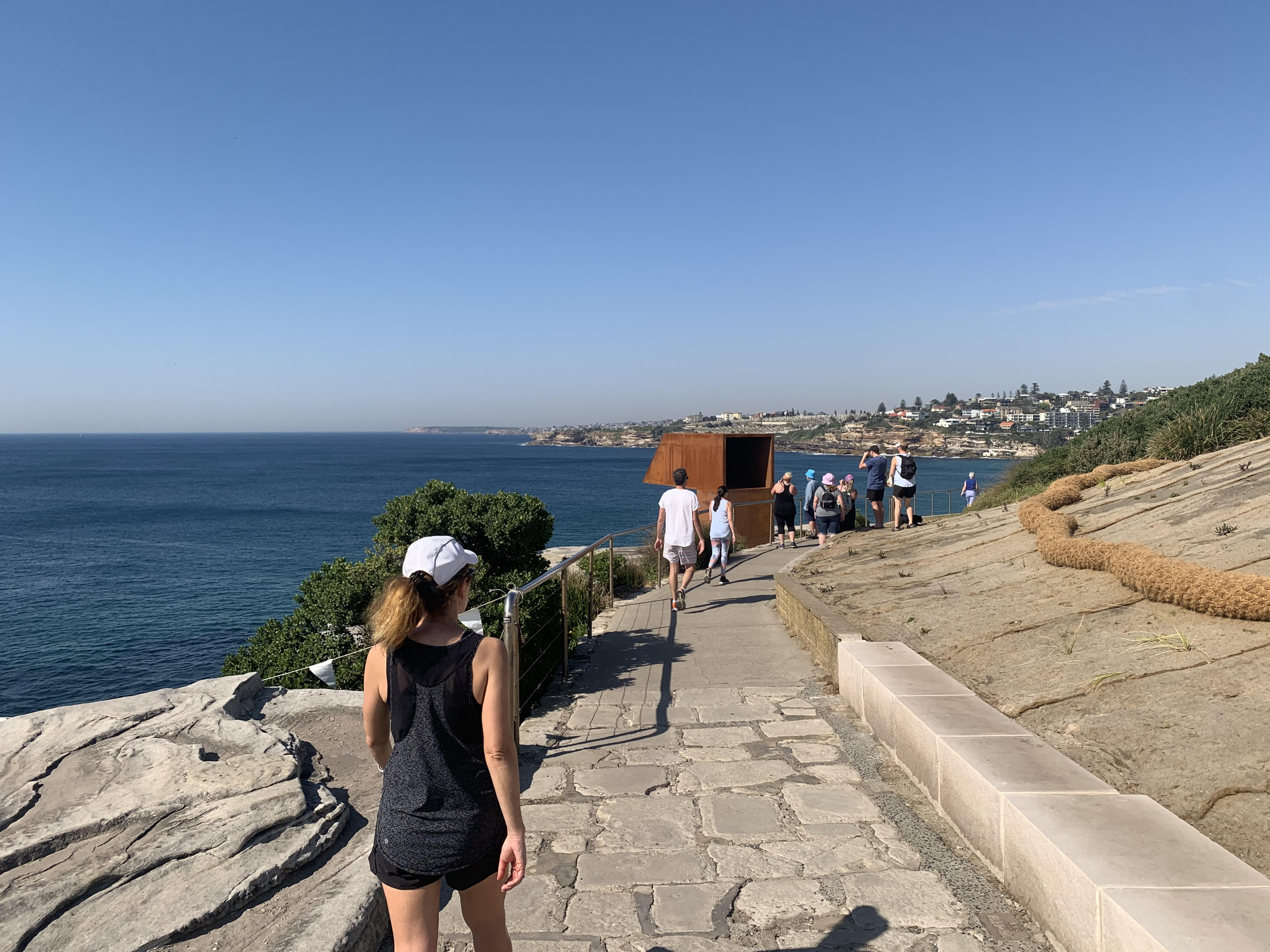
Walking is usually an excellent exercise option as an adjunct cancer treatment.

=== Synthetic lethality ===
Synthetic lethality arises when a combination of deficiencies in the expression of two or more genes leads to cell death, whereas a deficiency in only one of these genes does not. The deficiencies can arise through mutations, epigenetic alterations or inhibitors of one or both of the genes.

Cancer cells are frequently deficient in a DNA repair gene. (Also see DNA repair deficiency in cancer.) This DNA repair defect either may be due to mutation or, often, epigenetic silencing (see epigenetic silencing of DNA repair). If this DNA repair defect is in one of seven DNA repair pathways (see DNA repair pathways), and a compensating DNA repair pathway is inhibited, then the tumor cells may be killed by synthetic lethality. Non-tumorous cells, with the initial pathway intact, can survive.

==== Ovarian cancer ====
Mutations in DNA repair genes BRCA1 or BRCA2 (active in homologous recombinational repair) are synthetically lethal with inhibition of DNA repair gene PARP1 (active in the base excision repair and in the microhomology-mediated end joining pathways of DNA repair).

Ovarian cancers have a mutational defect in BRCA1 in about 18% of patients (13% germline mutations and 5% somatic mutations) (see BRCA1). Olaparib, a PARP inhibitor, was approved in 2014 by the US FDA for use in BRCA-associated ovarian cancer that had previously been treated with chemotherapy. The FDA, in 2016, also approved the PARP inhibitor rucaparib to treat women with advanced ovarian cancer who have already been treated with at least two chemotherapies and have a BRCA1 or BRCA2 gene mutation.

==== Colon cancer ====
In colon cancer, epigenetic defects in the WRN gene appear to be synthetically lethal with inactivation of TOP1. In particular, irinotecan inactivation of TOP1 was synthetically lethal with deficient expression of the DNA repair WRN gene in patients with colon cancer. In a 2006 study, 45 patients had colonic tumors with hypermethylated WRN gene promoters (silenced WRN expression), and 43 patients had tumors with unmethylated WRN gene promoters, so that WRN protein expression was high. Irinotecan was more strongly beneficial for patients with hypermethylated WRN promoters (39.4 months survival) than for those with unmethylated WRN promoters (20.7 months survival). The WRN gene promoter is hypermethylated in about 38% of colorectal cancers.

There are five different stages of colon cancer, and these five stages all have treatment:

- Stage 0, is where the patient is required to undergo surgery to remove the polyp (American Cancer Society).
- Stage 1, depending on the location of the cancer in the colon and lymph nodes, the patient undergoes surgery just like Stage 0.
- Stage 2 patients undergoes removing nearby lymph nodes, but depending on what the doctor says, the patient might have to undergo chemotherapy after surgery (if the cancer is at higher risk of coming back).
- Stage 3, is where the cancer has spread all throughout the lymph nodes but not yet to other organs or body parts. When getting to this stage, Surgery is conducted on the colon and lymph nodes, then the doctor orders Chemotherapy (FOLFOX or CapeOx) to treat the colon cancer in the location needed (American Cancer Society). The last a patient can get is Stage 4.
- Stage 4 patients only undergo surgery if it is for the prevention of the cancer, along with pain relief. If the pain continues with these two options, the doctor might recommended radiation therapy. The main treatment strategy is chemotherapy due to how aggressive the cancer becomes in this stage, not only to the colon but to the lymph nodes.

== Symptom control and palliative care ==
Although the control of the symptoms of cancer is not typically thought of as a treatment directed at the cancer, it is an important determinant of the quality of life of cancer patients, and plays an important role in the decision whether the patient is able to undergo other treatments. In general, doctors have the therapeutic skills to reduce pain including, chemotherapy-induced nausea and vomiting, diarrhea, hemorrhage and other common problems in cancer patients. The multidisciplinary specialty of palliative care has increased specifically in response to the symptom control needs for these groups of patients.

Pain medication, such as morphine, oxycodone, and antiemetics are drugs to suppress nausea and vomiting. These are very commonly used in patients with cancer-related symptoms. Improved antiemetics such as ondansetron and analogues, as well as aprepitant have made aggressive treatments much more feasible in cancer patients.

Cancer pain can be associated with continuing tissue damage due to the disease process, or the treatment (i.e. surgery, radiation, chemotherapy). There is always a role for environmental factors and affective disturbances in the genesis of pain behaviors, However these are not usually the predominant etiologic factors in patients with cancer pain. Some patients with severe pain associated with cancer are nearing the end of their lives, but in all cases, palliative therapies should be used to control the pain. Issues such as the social stigma of using opioids and health care consumption can be concerns and may need to be addressed for the person to feel comfortable taking the medications required to control his or her symptoms. The typical strategy for cancer pain management is to get the patient as comfortable as possible using the least amount of medications possible, even if that means using opioids, surgery, and physical measures.

Historically, doctors were reluctant to prescribe narcotics to terminal cancer patients due to addiction and respiratory function suppression. The palliative care movement, a more recent offshoot of the hospice movement, has engendered more widespread support for preemptive pain treatment for cancer patients. The World Health Organization also noted uncontrolled cancer pain as a worldwide problem and established a "ladder" as a guideline for how practitioners should treat pain in patients who have cancer

Cancer-related fatigue is a very common symptom of cancer, and there are a number of approaches put forward for helping with this.

=== Mental struggles/pain ===
Cancer patients undergo many obstacles and one of these includes mental strain. It is very common for cancer patients to become stressed, overwhelmed, uncertain, and even depressed. The use of chemo is a very harsh treatment causing the cells of the body to die. Physical effects like this do not only inflict pain but also cause patients to become mentally exhausted and want to give up. For a lot of reasons including these, hospitals offer many types of therapy and mental healing. Some of these include yoga, meditation, communication therapy, and spiritual ideas. All of these are meant to calm and relax the mind, or to give hope for the patients that may feel drained.

=== Insomnia ===
A common disorder experienced by people that have survived cancer treatments is insomnia. Almost 60% of cancer survivors experience insomnia, and if it is not treated properly, it can have long term effects on physiological and physical health. Insomnia is defined as dissatisfaction with sleep duration or quality and difficulties initiating or maintaining sleep. Insomnia can heavily reduce one's quality of life. Cognitive behavioral therapy for insomia (CBT-I) has been shown to reduce both insomnia and depression in cancer survivors. Acupuncture may also help reduce insomnia severity and improve sleep quality, although its effects are often similar to those of sham acupuncture and generally less pronounced than the benefits of CBT-I.

=== Muscle strength ===
Decreased muscle strength is a common side effect to many different cancer treatments. Because of this, exercise is very important especially in the first year after treatment. It has been shown that yoga, water exercise, and pilates can improve the emotional well-being and quality of life of breast cancer survivors.

=== Fatigue ===
Fatigue is an unrelenting feeling of physical and mental tiredness that cannot be traced back to activity levels. It is a very common experience in cancer survivors, with most patients reporting some level of fatigue before, during, and after treatment. The cause of the fatigue can be due to the cancer itself, but frequently it is medical interventions to treat the cancer – like chemotherapy, radiation, surgery, and hormone therapy – that cause the feelings of extreme tiredness. The exact processes behind cancer-related fatigue are unknown. However, evidence suggests that biological processes like inflammation and stress hormone disruption may play a role. In addition, pre-existing risk factors like a genetic predisposition, sleeping troubles, a pre-existing mood disorder, adverse childhood experiences, and low levels of physical activity are associated with increased levels of cancer-related fatigue.

Treatment options for cancer-related fatigue can be pharmacological or non-pharmacological. Medications like erythropoietin, stimulants, and antidepressants can be prescribed, but their efficacy is modest. Thus, non-pharmacological interventions are the preferred treatment for cancer-related fatigue. Aerobic exercise and psychosocial interventions like cognitive behavioral therapy and mindfulness show promise in reducing feelings of fatigue in cancer patients.

=== Hospice care ===
Hospice care provides palliative care at home, or in a dedicated hospice institution, for a person with an advanced illness termed as terminal. Untreated cancer will prove terminal, and sometimes a choice is made to forgo treatment and its unpleasant side effects, and opt instead for hospice care. Hospice care aims to provide support for the person's medical, emotional, social, practical, psychological, and spiritual needs.

Advance care planning (ACP) can help a person to decide for themself their future care wishes as they approach end of life. ACP helps adults at any stage of health to decide, and record in writing, their wishes for medical treatment preferences, and future wants, preferably as previously discussed with relatives or carers.

== Research ==
Clinical trials, also called research studies, test new treatments in people with cancer. The goal of this research is to find ways to treat cancer and help cancer patients. Clinical trials test many types of treatment such as new drugs, approaches to surgery or radiation therapy, new combinations of treatments, or new methods such as gene therapy. A clinical trial is one of the final stages of cancer research process. The search for new treatments begins in the laboratory, where scientists first develop and test new ideas. If an approach is promising, the next step may be testing a treatment in animals to see how it affects cancer in a living being, and whether it has harmful effects. Treatments that work well in the lab or in animals do not always work well in people. Studies are done with cancer patients to find out whether potential treatments are applicable to the population.

Patients who take part may be helped personally by the treatment they receive. They get up-to-date care from cancer experts, and they receive either a new treatment being tested or the best available standard treatment for their cancer. At the same time, new treatments also may have unknown risks, but if a new treatment proves effective or more effective than standard treatment, study patients who receive it may be among the first to benefit. There is no guarantee that a new treatment being tested or a standard treatment will produce good results. In children with cancer, a survey of trials found that those enrolled in trials were on average not more likely to do better or worse than those on standard treatment; this confirms that success or failure of an experimental treatment cannot be predicted.

Major research organisations around the world have made early-onset cancer a high priority, in response to demand for early detection and focused preventative measures, especially after a rise in cancers identified in younger adults seen in the early 21st century. In addition to investigating novel treatments, ongoing research also focuses on adjunct and supportive therapies aimed at reducing treatment toxicity and improving the quality of life for patients undergoing conventional care.

=== Exosome research ===
Exosomes are lipid-covered microvesicles shed by solid tumors into bodily fluids, such as blood and urine. Current research is being done attempting to use exosomes as a detection and monitoring method for a variety of cancers. The hope is to be able to detect cancer with a high sensitivity and specificity via detection of specific exosomes in the blood or urine. The same process can also be used to more accurately monitor a patient's treatment progress.

Exosomes, secreted by tumors, are also believed to be responsible for triggering programmed cell death (apoptosis) of immune cells; interrupting T-cell signaling required to mount an immune response; inhibiting the production of anti-cancer cytokines, and has implications in the spread of metastasis and allowing for angiogenesis. Studies are currently being done with "Lectin affinity plasmapheresis" (LAP), LAP is a blood filtration method which selectively targets the tumor based exosomes and removes them from the bloodstream. It is believed that decreasing the tumor-secreted exosomes in a patient's bloodstream will slow down progression of the cancer while at the same time increasing the patients own immune response.

=== Nutritional adjuncts ===
Some research has looked at whether omega‑3 supplements might help people who are going through chemotherapy or radiotherapy. A 2015 review of small studies, alongside more recent 2022 research, found signs that omega‑3s may help patients keep more of their body weight and muscle, support certain aspects of quality of life, and decrease treatment-related toxicity and inflammation. The evidence is still limited and the studies varied, so it is not known how meaningful these effects are. However, reviews note that patients taking omega‑3 supplements alongside conventional therapies do not do worse than those who do not. Similarly, a 2022 meta-analysis and a 2023 systematic review focusing on lung cancer patients undergoing radiotherapy and chemotherapy found that omega-3 supplementation helped improve nutritional status, such as maintaining body weight, and reduced markers of inflammation and treatment toxicity. Additionally, researchers are investigating the molecular mechanisms of omega-3s to see if they might help combat chemoresistance, particularly in breast cancer treatments. Another analysis looking at adults receiving chemotherapy or radiotherapy found that high‑calorie oral nutritional supplements without omega‑3 fats did not help patients maintain their weight, while high‑protein supplements enriched with omega‑3s were linked with better weight maintenance than similar‑calorie products without omega‑3s.

== Complementary and alternative ==
Complementary and alternative medicine (CAM) treatments are the diverse group of medical and health care systems, practices, and products that are not part of conventional medicine and have not been shown to be effective. "Complementary medicine" refers to methods and substances used along with conventional medicine, while "alternative medicine" refers to compounds used instead of conventional medicine. CAM use is common among people with cancer; a 2000 study found that 69% of cancer patients had used at least one CAM therapy as part of their cancer treatment. Most complementary and alternative medicines for cancer have not been rigorously studied or tested. Some alternative treatments which have been investigated and shown to be ineffective continue to be marketed and promoted.

== Special circumstances ==
=== In pregnancy ===
The incidence of pregnancy-associated cancer has risen due to the increasing age of pregnant mothers. Cancers may also be detected incidentally during maternal screening.

Cancer treatment needs to be selected to do least harm to both the woman and her embryo/fetus. In some cases a therapeutic abortion may be recommended.

Radiation therapy is out of the question, and chemotherapy always poses the risk of miscarriage and congenital malformations. Little is known about the effects of medications on the child.

Even if a drug has been tested as not crossing the placenta to reach the child, some cancer forms can harm the placenta and make the drug pass over it anyway. Some forms of skin cancer may even metastasize to the child's body.

Diagnosis is also made more difficult, since computed tomography is infeasible because of its high radiation dose. Still, magnetic resonance imaging works normally. However, contrast media cannot be used, since they cross the placenta.

As a consequence of the difficulties to properly diagnose and treat cancer during pregnancy, the alternative methods are either to perform a Cesarean section when the child is viable in order to begin a more aggressive cancer treatment, or, if the cancer is malignant enough that the mother is unlikely to be able to wait that long, to perform an abortion in order to treat the cancer.

=== In utero ===
Fetal tumors are sometimes diagnosed while still in utero. Teratoma is the most common type of fetal tumor, and usually is benign. In some cases these are surgically treated while the fetus is still in the uterus.

== Society and culture ==
=== Racial and social disparities ===
Cancer is a significant issue that is affecting the world. Specifically in the U.S., 1,735,350 new cases of cancer, and 609,640 deaths were expected by the end of 2018. Adequate treatment can prevent many cancer deaths but there are racial and social disparities in treatments which has a significant factor in high death rates. Minorities are more likely to receive inadequate treatment while white patients are more likely to receive efficient treatments in a timely manner. Having satisfactory treatment in a timely manner can increase the patient's likelihood of survival. It has been shown that chances of survival are significantly greater for white patients than for African American patients.

The annual average mortality of patients with colorectal cancer between 1992 and 2000 was 27 and 18.5 per 100,000 white patients and 35.4 and 25.3 per 100,000 black patients. In a journal that analyzed multiple studies testing racial disparities when treating colorectal cancer found contradicting findings. The US Veterans Administration and an adjuvant trial found that there was no evidence to support racial differences in treating colorectal cancer. However, two studies suggested that African American patients received less satisfactory and poorer quality treatment compared to white patients. One of these studies specifically was provided by the Center for Intramural Research. They found that black patients were 41% less likely to receive colorectal treatment and were more likely to be hospitalized in a teaching hospital with less certified physicians compared to white patients. Furthermore, black patients were more likely to be diagnosed with oncologic sequelae, which is a severity of the illness in result of poorly treated cancer. Lastly, for every 1,000 patients in the hospital, there were 137.4 black patient deaths and 95.6 white patient deaths.

An article in a breast cancer journal analyzed the disparities of breast cancer treatments in the Appalachian Mountains. African American women were found to be three times more likely to die compared to Asians and two times more likely to die compared to white women. According to the study, African American women are at a survival disadvantage compared to other races. Black women are also more likely to receive less successful treatment than white women by not receiving surgery or therapy. Furthermore, the US National Cancer Institute panel identified breast cancer treatments, given to black women, as inappropriate and not adequate compared to the treatment given to white women.

From these studies, researchers have noted that there are definite disparities in the treatment of cancer, specifically who has access to the best treatment and can receive it in a timely manner. This eventually leads to disparities between who dies from cancer and who is more likely to survive.

The cause of these disparities is generally that African Americans have less medical care coverage, insurance and access cancer centers than other races. For an example, black patients with breast cancer and colorectal cancer were shown to be more likely to have Medicaid or no insurance compared to other races. The location of the health care facility also plays a role in why African Americans receive less treatment in comparison to other races. However, some studies say that African Americans do not trust doctors and do not always seek the help they need and that this explains why fewer African Americans receive treatment. Others suggest that African Americans seek more treatment than whites and that it is simply a lack of the resources available to them. In this case, analyzing these studies will identify the treatment disparities and look to prevent them by discovering potential causes of these disparities.

=== Public perception ===
Despite recognition of improvements in outcomes, visceral fear of the disease is ubiquitous, and people may have to struggle to control it.

Among lung cancer patients, stigma, shame, social isolation, and discrimination are common. Such patients are sometimes told that they deserve cancer because of their smoking. Those patients also may have feelings of guilt for having cancer. Stigma in cervical cancer was predominantly driven by fear of social judgment and rejection, self-blame, and shame, with notable negative influences from gender and social norms, as both human papillomavirus infection and cervical cancer were stigmatized due to the perception that they arise from reckless behavior such as having multiple sexual partners or neglecting screening. Resilience may be a potent protective mechanism against stigmatization. Resilience in context of cancer treatment is patient's physiological and psychological capacity to effectively adapt, recover, and maintain optimal functioning in the face of the medical challenges. It encompasses the ability to cope with and overcome adversity, maintain emotional well-being, and promote overall health and healing.

== See also ==
- American Cancer Society
- Cancer and nausea
- Cancer prevention
- Experimental cancer treatment
- Global Task Force on Expanded Access to Cancer Care and Control in Developing Countries
- List of antineoplastic agents
- List of cancer hospitals
- List of unproven and disproven cancer treatments
- Precision medicine
- Timeline of cancer treatment development
- Tumor-informed metabolism
- Multimodal cancer therapy
- War metaphors in cancer
- World Cancer Day

== Bibliography ==
- "Understanding What Cancer Is: Ancient Times to Present". cancer.org.
- Chahine S, Urquhart R (October 2019). "A cross-sectional population-based survey looking at the impact of cancer survivorship care plans on meeting the needs of cancer survivors in the posttreatment stage". Supportive Care in Cancer. 27 (10): 3785–3792. doi:10.1007/s00520-019-04685-5. PMID 30721368. S2CID 59604164.
- Colby DA, Shifren K (1 January 2013). "Optimism, mental health, and quality of life: A study among breast cancer patients". Psychology, Health & Medicine. 18 (1): 10–20. doi:10.1080/13548506.2012.686619. PMID 22690751. S2CID 205772143.
- "How Does Radiation Therapy Work?" American Cancer Society. N.p., n.d. Web. 21 March 2017.
- Piazza MF, Galletta M, Portoghese I, Pilia I, Ionta MT, Contu P, Mereu A, Campagna M (August 2017). "Meeting psychosocial and health information needs to ensure quality of cancer care in outpatients". European Journal of Oncology Nursing. 29: 98–105. doi:10.1016/j.ejon.2017.06.001. PMID 28720273.
- Northouse LL (1 September 2012). "Helping Patients and Their Family Caregivers Cope With Cancer". Oncology Nursing Forum. 39 (5): 500–506. doi:10.1188/12.ONF.500-506. PMID 22940514. S2CID 21512508.
- "Radiation Therapy for Brain Cancer | CTCA." CancerCenter.com. N.p., 1 January 0001. Web. 21 March 2017.
- "Radiation Therapy for Cancer." National Cancer Institute. N.p., n.d. Web. 21 March 2017.
