= RI-1 (chemical) =

Names
- Preferred IUPAC name 3-Chloro-1-(3,4-dichlorophenyl)-4-(morpholin-4-yl)-1H-pyrrole-2,5-dione

Identifiers
CAS Number	415713-60-9
3D model (JSmol)	Interactive image
ChEMBL	ChEMBL1271993
ChemSpider	916523
PubChem CID	1074953
UNII	S8WG8ZRQ99
CompTox Dashboard (EPA)	DTXSID30360083
- InChI: InChI=1S/C14H11Cl3N2O3/c15-9-2-1-8(7-10(9)16)19-13(20)11(17)12(14(19)21)18-3-5-22-6-4-18/h1-2,7H,3-6H2 Key: MWSUIZKGNWELRF-UHFFFAOYSA-N
- SMILES: C1COCCN1C2=C(C(=O)N(C2=O)C3=CC(=C(C=C3)Cl)Cl)Cl

Properties
Chemical formula	C_{14}H_{11}Cl_{3}N_{2}O_{3}
Molar mass	361.60 g·mol^{−1}
- Except where otherwise noted, data are given for materials in their standard state (at 25 °C [77 °F], 100 kPa). Infobox references

RI-1 is a selective inhibitor of RAD51, which is a central gene molecule of homologous recombination, with IC_{50} ranging from 5 to 30 μM.

== Antitumor mechanism ==
RAD51 is a eukaryote gene, encoding RAD51 protein that participates in DNA damage induction and complex signal pathway of cell cycle checkpoint of homologous recombination in cells. However, over-expression of RAD51 may lead the occurrence and development progress of tumours and besides, the insensitivity of tumours to chemoradiotherapy. At present, over-expression of RAD51 has been found in many kinds of human cancers, such as breast cancer, lung cancer and ovarian cancer.

RI-1 inhibits the over-expression of RAD51 in cancer cells by bonding covalently to the surface of RAD51 protein at Cys 319 and irreversibly loosen a protein-protein interface that is essential for filament formation and recombinase activity.

Targeted drugs to RAD51 has the prospect to be a new generation of oncologic drugs, like RI-1. It is also a unique tool for mechanism studies of DNA repair.

== Literature ==
- Budke, B.; et al. (2013). "An optimized RAD51 inhibitor that disrupts homologous recombination without requiring Michael acceptor reactivity". J Med Chem. 56 (1): 254–63. doi:10.1021/jm301565b. PMC 3619390. PMID 23231413.
- Budke, B.; et al. (2012). "RI-1: a chemical inhibitor of RAD51 that disrupts homologous recombination in human cells". Nucleic Acids Res. 40 (15): 7347–57. doi:10.1093/nar/gks353. PMC 3424541. PMID 22573178.
