= Global Task Force on Expanded Access to Cancer Care and Control in Developing Countries =

The Global Task Force on Expanded Access to Cancer Care and Control in Developing Countries

The Global Task Force on Expanded Access to Cancer Care and Control in Developing Countries (GTF.CCC) is a research and advisory initiative directed by the Harvard Global Equity Initiative, the Harvard Medical School, the Harvard School of Public Health, the Fred Hutchinson Cancer Research Center, the University of Washington and the University of Washington Medicine to address the global burden of cancer in developing countries. This initiative, originally convened in 2009 by four Harvard-based institutions including the Dana–Farber Cancer Institute, comprises a network of more than thirty leaders in the fields of cancer and global health from around the world. GTF.CCC also draws on more than 50 technical and strategic advisors, a private sector engagement group, a strategic advisory committee, and a dual secretariat of staff based at the Harvard Global Equity Initiative and the Fred Hutchinson Cancer Research Center.

== Mandate ==
The mandate of the GTF.CCC is to design, implement and evaluate innovative strategies for expanding access to cancer prevention, detection and care. The initiative focuses on the creation of global facilities and strategies for the financing and procurement of affordable, essential cancer drugs, vaccines and services for prevention, diagnosis, treatment, survivorship and palliation. Through local partners, the GTF.CCC supports implementation of innovative service delivery models that provide evidence for scaling up access to cancer care and control, and strengthening health systems in developing countries.

== Justification ==
Although once considered a problem exclusive to high-income countries, cancer is a leading cause of death and disability in the developing world. Of the 7 million cancer deaths in the world today, approximately 70% occur in developing countries. By 2030, low and middle income countries will bear the brunt of an estimated 27 million new cancer cases and 17 million cancer deaths.

Case fatality for the cancers that can be treated or prevented is much higher in the developing world – a result of grave inequity in the opportunity to survive the disease. In the case of breast cancer, the ratio of deaths to incident cases in 2002 was an estimated 56% in low-income countries, 44% in low-middle income countries and 39% in high-middle income developing countries. In the developed world, it was 24%.

The world faces a huge and largely unperceived cost of inaction from cancer in the developing world, which calls for an immediate and large-scale global response.

== Structure and Leadership ==
The Task Force is a 36-member body combining leaders in cancer and global health and co-chaired by Julio Frenk, Dean of the Harvard School of Public Health and Lawrence Corey, President and Director of the Fred Hutchinson Cancer Research Center. Her Royal Highness Princess Dina Mired of Jordan and Lance Armstrong serve as Honorary Co-Presidents. The Harvard Global Equity Initiative, under the direction of Felicia Knaul and Julie Gralow, serves as the Secretariat for the Task Force.

== History ==
The GTF.CCC was launched on November 4, 2009, at Harvard University during the International Conference ‘Breast Cancer in the Developing World: Meeting the Unforeseen Challenge to Women, Health and Equity.’

== Activities ==
A key contribution of the Task Force is the GTF.CCC Report published in 2011. The content of the GTF.CCC Report follows from the mandate of the Task Force and provides the building blocks of a strategy for expanded cancer care and control strategies in the developing world.

The report includes the below content:

• A list of priority cancers in the developing world,

• the definition of an essential package of services and drugs,

• estimates of potential demand for drugs,

• designs and strategies for service delivery models that harness the primary and secondary levels of health care systems and expand access while reducing cost,

• mechanisms for regional and global negotiation of drug prices, and

• options for scaling-up service delivery and monitoring health outcomes.

Following the dictum of thinking globally and acting locally, the GTF.CCC reviews and builds on the lessons learned from work in specific countries, as well as dedicating itself to expanding cancer care and control in these countries. Innovative and successful models have been identified constituting three models and spanning five countries of differing levels of income (Rwanda, Malawi, Haiti, Mexico and Jordan). These models will serve as dynamic learning laboratories for generating and applying the specific proposals and delivery models that are designed by the GTF.CCC and detailed in the report introduced above. The pilot programs will specifically focus on developing, designing, implementing and evaluating innovations in delivery in the areas of task shifting, infrastructure shifting and the use of technology.

The GTF.CCC partner projects were chosen based on the opportunity to expand access to cancer care and control, as well as the ongoing involvement of members of the GTF.CCC and/or the Secretariat. Thus, this aspect of the work of the GTF.CCC does not involve establishing new projects, but rather working to improve, extend, expand and scale-up initiatives and institutions that are already well-established. The partner programs listed below are locally entrenched and independently sustainable.

For 2010, the local partners and programs are:

• Rwanda, Malawi, Haiti: Partners in Health working with Dana Farber Cancer Institute, Brigham and Women’s Hospital and Harvard Medical School.

• Mexico: the National Commission of Social Protection for Health, the Ministries of Health of the States of Morelos, Jalisco and Nuevo León, the National Institute of Public Health of Mexico, the National Cancer Institute of Mexico, the Mexican Health Foundation, and the program Cáncer de mama: Tómatelo a pecho.

• Jordan: King Hussein Cancer Foundation and Center, and the Jordan Breast Cancer Program
