= Hexetidine =

Anti-bacterial agent

Clinical data
- Trade names: Bactidol, others
- AHFS/Drugs.com: International Drug Names
- Pregnancy category: Not to be used by pregnant women
- Routes of administration: Topical (mouthwash)
- ATC code: A01AB12 (WHO) G01AX16 (WHO)

Legal status
- Legal status: In general: Over-the-counter (OTC)

Identifiers
- IUPAC name: 1,3-bis(2-ethylhexyl)-5-methylhexahydropyrimidin-5-amine
- CAS Number: 141-94-6
- PubChem CID: 3607
- DrugBank: DB08958
- ChemSpider: 32697287
- UNII: 852A84Y8LS
- ChEMBL: ChEMBL144673
- CompTox Dashboard (EPA): DTXSID1045297
- ECHA InfoCard: 100.005.012

Chemical and physical data
- Formula: C_{21}H_{45}N_{3}
- Molar mass: 339.612 g·mol^{−1}
- 3D model (JSmol): Interactive image
- SMILES: CCCCC(CC)CN1CC(CN(C1)CC(CC)CCCC)(C)C
- InChI: InChI=1S/C22H46N2/c1-7-11-13-20(9-3)15-23-17-22(5,6)18-24(19-23)16-21(10-4)14-12-8-2/h20-21H,7-19H2,1-6H3; Key:ZSHBZCXOMHHPCE-UHFFFAOYSA-N

Hexetidine is an anti-bacterial and anti-fungal agent commonly used in both veterinary and human medicine. It is a local anesthetic, astringent and deodorant and has antiplaque effects.

Hexetidine (then as insecticide) patent application was filed in 1945 and granted in 1947 to Murray Senkus of Commercial Solvents Corporation.

Hexetidine is the medicinal ingredient in Sterisol, which is labelled for the symptomatic treatment of: streptococcal pharyngitis ('strep throat'), tonsillitis, pharyngitis, laryngitis, gingivitis, ulcerative stomatitis, oral thrush and Vincent's angina; postoperative hygiene following tonsillectomy, throat or oral surgery. Hexetidine is not the same as Chlorhexidine, another chemical commonly used in mouthwash, or the antimicrobial drug Hexedene (C_{22}H_{45}N_{3}).

In the UK, hexetidine is the active ingredient in the medicated mouthwash branded Oraldene. In Canada, hexetidine was the active ingredient in the medicated mouthwash branded Steri/sol which has been discontinued. It used to be produced by McNeil Consumer Healthcare, a division of Johnson & Johnson (originally Warner–Lambert, then marketed by Pfizer after its acquisition since 2007). Oraldene contains 0.1 g/100 ml of hexetidine. In some European countries, the gargle solution and mouth spray in bottles of 40 ml named Hexoral (by Mcneil) also contains 0.2% hexetidine as its active compound. In Greece it is called Hexalen mouth wash (also available in spray). Hexetidine can also be found in the mouthwash Bactidol (by Mcneil) which is sold in many Asian countries. In Germany, hexetidine vaginal suppositories branded Vagi-Hex are available to be used for vaginal antisepsis. They are also used in late pregnancy for reducing neonatal infectious mortality and morbidity due to group B streptococcal infections; nonetheless, hexetidine is to be used with care during pregnancy, and its vaginal use is counter-indicated in the first three months of pregnancy.

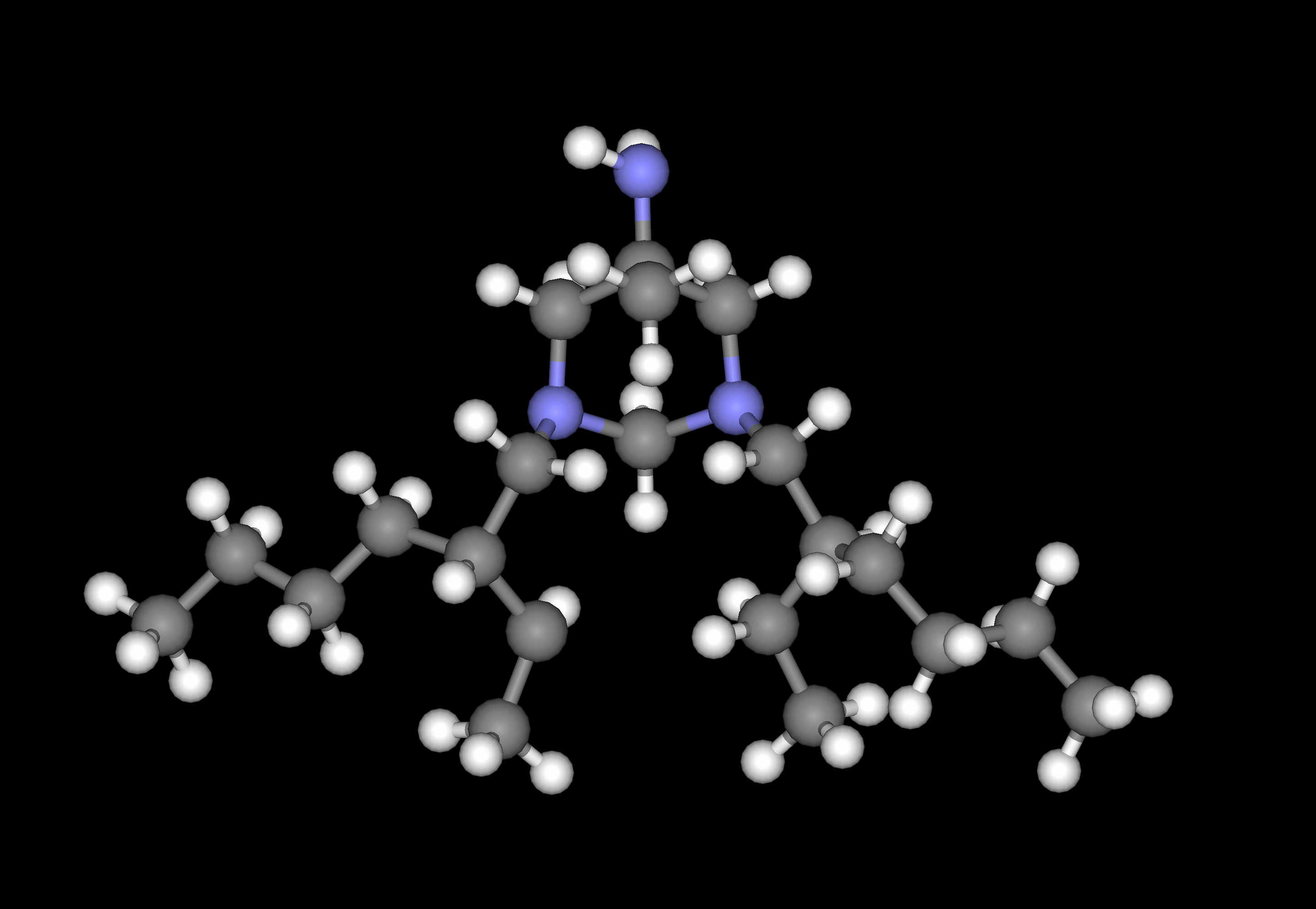
Hexetidine
