= Caphosol =

Medicated mouth rinse

Caphosol (EUSA Pharma) is a mouth rinse designed to moisten, lubricate and clean the oral cavity including the mucosa of the mouth, tongue and oropharynx which has been shown to prevent and treat oral mucositis in patients receiving radiation therapy or chemotherapy for the treatment of cancer.

== Clinical evidence ==
There is a lack of good quality evidence for the efficacy of caphosol solution and the only systematic review is funded by the manufacturer and so carries an increased risk of bias.

=== Bone marrow transplant ===
The safety and efficacy of Caphosol has been demonstrated in a double-blind prospective, randomized clinical trial in patients undergoing bone marrow transplantation. This trial demonstrated that Caphosol, used in conjunction with fluoride treatments, offers significant benefits over standard care, and is a significant adjunct in the management of oral mucositis associated with high-dose chemotherapy and radiation therapy. In this study the duration and severity of oral mucositis, and requirements for opioid medication, were evaluated in 95 patients undergoing bone marrow transplantation. The treatment arm received 4 topical fluoride treatments plus Caphosol, while the control arm received a fluoride rinse (0.01% NaF aqueous solution). Patients were instructed to rinse 4 times per day at the start of cancer treatment and up to 10 times per day if they developed severe oral mucositis. The results showed:

- More than twice as many bone marrow transplant patients avoided oral mucositis by using Caphosol
- Duration of oral mucositis was almost halved in patients using Caphosol
- Caphosol patients used 72% less morphine for pain relief, with nearly 75% of patients requiring no morphine at all.

=== Head and neck cancer ===
Caphosol has also been associated with low occurrence and severity of oral mucositis in a registry of cancer patients. The registry data provide further evidence to support the use of Caphosol to treat oral mucositis and suggest that Caphosol is associated with a low occurrence and severity of oral mucositis with high adherence to treatment as well as high levels of satisfaction from both patients and physicians.

The registry analysed the effects of Caphosol in head and neck cancer patients along with the frequency of patient dosing, adherence to treatment, and patient and physician global satisfaction assessments. Patients at risk of oral mucositis were given Caphosol, and instructed to rinse 4–10 times daily, depending on the severity of the mucositis. Patients and physicians completed questionnaires on the symptoms of oral mucositis, mucositis severity and satisfaction with the treatment.

The results showed that 88% of patients receiving chemotherapy and/or radiotherapy for head and neck cancer who had used Caphosol experienced no or low grade (mild-moderate) oral mucositis, and 44% experienced mild or no oral pain. Furthermore, the vast majority of head and neck cancer patients (79%) and physicians (78%) were satisfied with Caphosol as a treatment for mucositis.

=== Cancer therapy mucositis in children ===
A a prospective multicenter double-blind randomized controlled trial showed no advantages for caphosol, and statistically significantly more days of pain and analgesia use for the caphosol arm.

== Composition ==
According to the manufacturer, solution consists of:

- Disodium phosphate 0.052%
- Monosodium phosphate 0.009%
- Calcium chloride 0.052%
- Sodium chloride 0.569%
- Purified water
