= Gelclair =

Medicinal oral gel

Gelclair is a medicinal oral gel containing polyvinylpyrrolidone (PVP) and hyaluronic acid that coats the surface of the mouth forming a thin protective film over painful oral lesions, such as those caused by radiotherapy or chemotherapy treatment for cancer.

== Uses ==
Gelclair can be used in the management of the painful symptoms of oral mucositis usually caused by radiotherapy or chemotherapy treatment for cancer but can also be caused by medication, disease, oral surgery, stress, traumatic ulcers caused by dental braces and dentures, and ageing.

== Clinical evidence ==
Innocenti et al. studied Gelclair in a total of thirty patients with chemotherapy-induced oral lesions. Results showed a 92% reduction in mean pain scores 5–7 hours after the first administration of Gelclair. Patients were also given Gelclair for a further 7–10 days and at the end of this period, pain scores were recorded. After one week of using Gelclair, 87% of patients reported overall improvements relating to pain in swallowing food, liquids, and saliva.

De Cordi et al. studied thirty patients with lesions of the mouth and oropharynx (caused by various diseases). 83% of patients reported a reduction in pain, 13% remained the same and 3% showed initial improvement but then got worse. 83% showed a distinct improvement in functionality in the ability to take food, 7% remained the same, and 7% got worse, while 3% reported considerable improvement followed by slight worsening. 57% of patients reported an improvement in the grade of oral mucositis, 40% remained the same while 3% got worse.

Berndtson studied ten patients who were given Gelclair to evaluate its effect on their symptoms of oral mucositis. All reported that the product was acceptable for its taste and consistency, and a palliative soothing effect was noted.

A 2006 study found Gelclair was no more effective than "current standard practice" in relieving pain associated with radiotherapy-induced Oral mucositis.
