= Sodium fluoride/malic acid =

Medication

Combination of
- Sodium fluoride: Teeth strengthener
- Malic acid: Saliva stimulant

Clinical data
- Trade names: Xerodent

Identifiers
- CAS Number: 1253526-86-1

Sodium fluoride/malic acid (trade name Xerodent) is a type of mouthwash consisting of the teeth-strengthening sodium fluoride and the saliva stimulant malic acid. It is used in xerostomia.
