= Zeaxanthin glucosyltransferase =

Class of enzymes

Identifiers
- EC no.: 2.4.1.276

Databases
- IntEnz: IntEnz view
- BRENDA: BRENDA entry
- ExPASy: NiceZyme view
- KEGG: KEGG entry
- MetaCyc: metabolic pathway
- PRIAM: profile
- PDB structures: RCSB PDB PDBe PDBsum
Search
- PMC: articles
- PubMed: articles
- NCBI: proteins

Zeaxanthin glucosyltransferase (EC 2.4.1.276, crtX (gene)) is an enzyme with systematic name UDP-glucose:zeaxanthin beta-D-glucosyltransferase. This enzyme catalyses the following chemical reaction

2 UDP-glucose + zeaxanthin $\rightleftharpoons$ 2 UDP + zeaxanthin bis(beta-D-glucoside)

The reaction proceeds in two steps with the monoglucoside as an intermediate.
