= Mucositis =

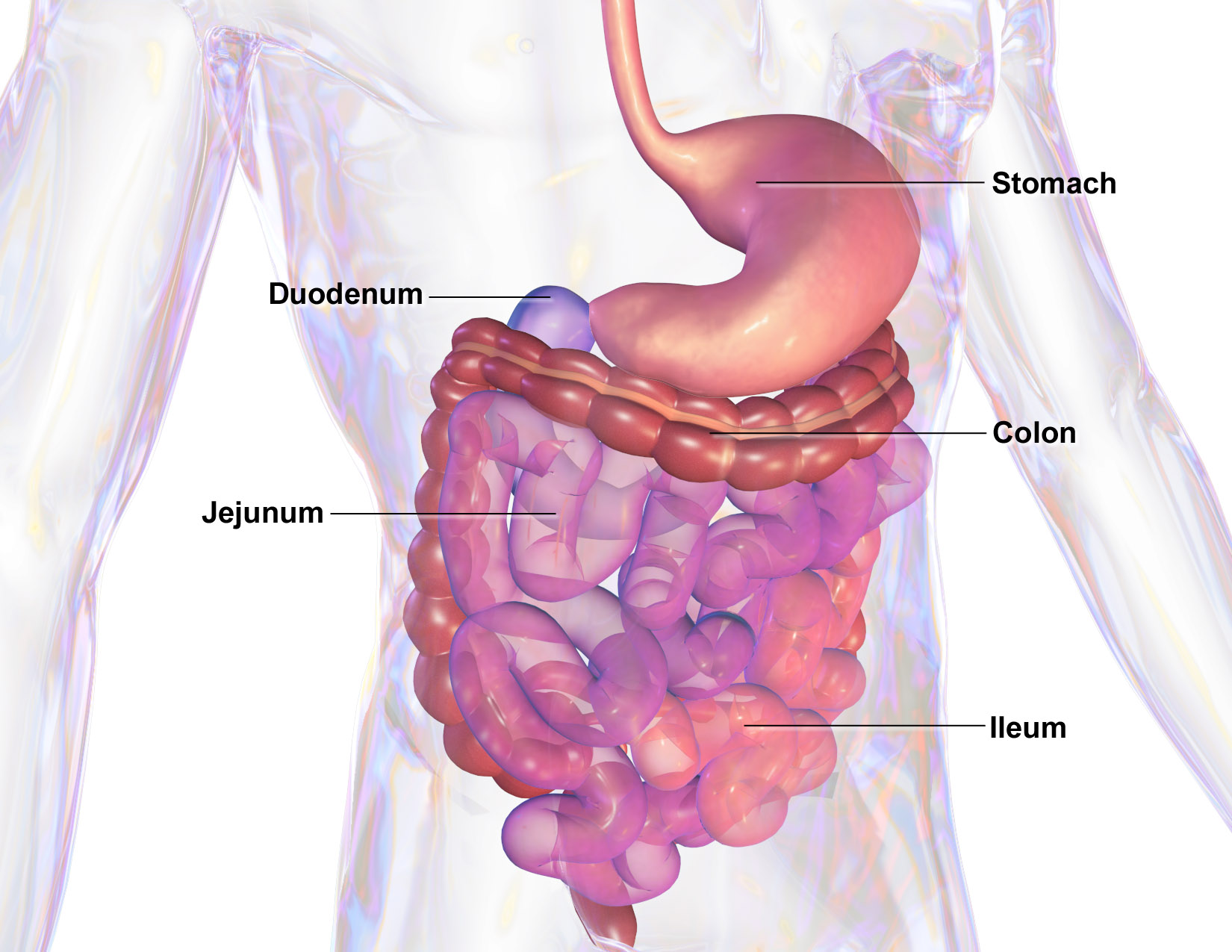
- Illustration of the human gastrointestinal tract
- Specialty: Gastroenterology
- Symptoms: Red burn-like sores or ulcers throughout the mouth
- Causes: chemotherapy and radiotherapy treatment

Mucositis is the painful inflammation and ulceration of the mucous membranes lining the digestive tract, usually as an adverse effect of chemotherapy and radiotherapy treatment for cancer. Mucositis can occur anywhere along the gastrointestinal (GI) tract, but oral mucositis refers to the particular inflammation and ulceration that occurs in the mouth. Oral mucositis is a common and often debilitating complication of cancer treatment.

Oral and gastrointestinal (GI) mucositis affects almost all patients undergoing high-dose chemotherapy and hematopoietic stem cell transplantation (HSCT), 80% of patients with cancers of the head and neck receiving radiotherapy, and a wide range of patients receiving chemotherapy. Alimentary tract mucositis increases mortality and morbidity and contributes to rising health care costs.

For most cancer treatment, about 5–15% of patients get mucositis. However, with 5-fluorouracil (5-FU), up to 40% get mucositis, and 10–15% get grade 3–4 oral mucositis. Irinotecan is associated with severe GI mucositis in over 20% of patients. 75-80% of bone marrow transplantation recipients experience mucositis, of which oral mucositis is the most common and most debilitating, especially when melphalan is used. In grade 3 oral mucositis, the patient is unable to eat solid food, and in grade 4, the patient is unable to consume liquids as well.

Radiotherapy to the head and neck or to the pelvis or abdomen is associated with Grade 3 and Grade 4 oral or GI mucositis, respectively, often exceeding 50% of patients. Among patients undergoing head and neck radiotherapy, pain and decreased oral function may persist long after the conclusion of therapy. Fractionated radiation dosage increases the risk of mucositis to > 70% of patients in most trials. Oral mucositis is particularly profound and prolonged among HSCT recipients who receive total-body irradiation.

== Signs and symptoms ==
Oral cancer patients undergoing chemotherapy usually become symptomatic four to five days after beginning treatment, reaching a peak at around day 10, and then slowly improving over the course of a few weeks. Mucositis associated with radiotherapy usually appears at the end of the second week of treatment and may last for six to eight weeks.

As a result of cell death in reaction to chemo- or radio-therapy, the mucosal lining of the mouth becomes thin, may slough off and then become red, inflamed and ulcerated. The ulcers may become covered by a yellowish-white fibrin clot called a pseudomembrane. Peripheral erythema is usually present. Ulcers may range from 0.5 cm to greater than 4 cm. Oral mucositis can be severely painful. The degree of pain is usually related to the extent of the tissue damage. Pain is often described as a burning sensation accompanied by reddening. Due to pain, the patient may experience trouble speaking, eating, or even opening the mouth.

Dysgeusia, or an alteration in taste perception, is common, especially for those who are receiving concomitant radiation therapy to the neck and mouth area. "Taste blindness", or an altered sense of taste, is a temporary condition that occurs because of effects on taste buds that are mostly located in the tongue. Sometimes, only partial recovery of taste occurs. Common complaints are of food tasting too sweet or too bitter or of a continuous metallic taste.

=== Complications ===
Sores or ulcerations can become infected by virus, bacteria or fungus. Pain and loss of taste perception makes it more difficult to eat, which leads to weight loss. Ulcers may act as a site for local infection and a portal of entry for oral flora that, in some instances, may cause septicaemia (especially in immunosuppressed patients). Therefore, oral mucositis can be a dose-limiting condition, disrupting a patient's optimal cancer treatment plan and consequentially decreasing their chances of survival.

== Pathophysiology ==
The pathophysiology of mucositis is complex and multifactorial. Currently, Sonis' five phase model is the accepted explanation for the process. The 5 stages are:

1. Initiation phase. Free radicals are produced due to DNA damage caused by chemo- or radiotherapy.
2. Primary damage response. Chemotherapy, radiotherapy and free radicals all contribute to the activation of transcription factors, such as NF-κB. This results in the upregulation of pro-inflammatory cytokines, ceramide, nitric oxide and matrix metalloproteinases. The consequence of this is mucosal destruction, caused by thinning of the epithelium due to tissue injury and cell death.
3. Signal amplification. Positive or negative feedback loops involving some of the molecules in the previous phase can exacerbate or prolong tissue injury. For example, the pro-inflammatory cytokine TNF-α can positively feedback on NF-κB thus inducing more pro-inflammatory cytokine production.
4. Ulceration. Bacteria colonise ulcers and their cell wall products infiltrate the submucosa. This leads to activation of tissue macrophages, which causes further production of pro-inflammatory cytokines. In addition, bacteria-mediated immune signalling via Toll-like receptors (TLRs) ambiguously shapes chemotherapy-induced genotoxic damage in the gastrointestinal tract.
5. Healing. Signalling from the extracellular matrix of the submucosa results in epithelial proliferation and differentiation, and thus a thickening of the epithelium. The local oral flora are reinstated.

== Diagnosis ==
Diagnosis is based on the symptoms the patient is experiencing and the appearance of the tissues of the mouth following chemotherapy, bone marrow transplants or radiotherapy. Red burn-like sores or ulcers throughout the mouth is enough to diagnose mucositis.

The severity of oral mucositis can be evaluated using several different assessment tools. Two of the most commonly used are the World Health Organization (WHO) Oral Toxicity score and the National Cancer Institute Common Toxicity Criteria (NCI-CTC) for Oral Mucositis. While the NCI system has separate scores for appearance (erythema and ulceration) and function (pain and ability to eat solids, liquids, or nothing by mouth), the WHO score combines both elements into a single score that grades the severity of the condition from 0 (no oral mucositis) to 4 (swallowing not possible such that patient needs supplementary nutrition). Another scale developed in 1999, the Oral Mucositis Assessment Scale (OMAS) has been shown to be highly reproducible between observers, responsive over time, and accurate in recording symptoms associated with mucositis. The OMAS provides an objective assessment of oral mucositis based on assessment of the appearance and extent of redness and ulceration in various areas of the mouth.

== Prevention ==
A 2015 Cochrane systematic review assessing the prevention of chemotherapy-induced oral mucositis concluded that oral cryotherapy leads to large reductions in the incidence of oral mucositis of all severities in adults receiving 5-FU treatment for solid cancers. The evidence also indicates a reduction of oral mucositis in adults receiving high-dose melphalan-based cancer treatment prior to haematopoietic stem cell transplantation, although there is uncertainty regarding the size of the reduction in this instance. No evidence was found for use of this preventive measure in children. Oral cryotherapy involves the placement of rounded ice chips in the mouth, which cools the oral tissues and causes vasoconstriction. This decreases blood flow to the region and, hence, also restricts the amounts of the chemotherapy drugs delivered to the tissues.

== Treatment ==
Treatment of mucositis is mainly supportive. Oral hygiene is the mainstay of treatment; patients are encouraged to clean their mouth every four hours and at bedtime, more often if the mucositis becomes worse.

Water-soluble jellies can be used to lubricate the mouth. Salt mouthwash can soothe the pain and keep food particles clear so as to avoid infection. Patients are also encouraged to drink plenty of liquids, at least three liters a day, and avoid alcohol. Citrus fruits, alcohol, and foods that are hot are all known to aggravate mucositis lesions. Medicinal mouthwashes may be used such as Chlorhexidine gluconate and viscous Lidocaine for relief of pain. However, care should be taken as the high doses of viscous lidocaine may cause adverse effects. A study reported that lidocaine has a potential toxicity; when it was tested on patients with oral mucositis who underwent a bone marrow transplant, lidocaine anesthetic mouthwash was found to be systemically absorbed.

Palifermin is a human KGF (keratinocyte growth factor) that has shown to enhance epithelial cell proliferation, differentiation, and migration. Experimental therapies have been reported, including the use of cytokines and other modifiers of inflammation (e.g., IL-1, IL-11, TGF-beta3), amino acid supplementation (e.g., glutamine), vitamins, colony-stimulating factors, cryotherapy, and laser therapy.

Symptomatic relief of the pain of oral mucositis may be provided by barrier protection agents such as concentrated oral gel products (e.g. Gelclair). Caphosol is a mouth rinse which has been shown to prevent and treat oral mucositis caused by radiation and high-dose chemotherapy. MuGard is a FDA-cleared mucoadhesive oral protectant, developed by Access Pharmaceuticals, Inc., that is designed to form a protective hydrogel coating over the oral mucosa while a patient is undergoing chemotherapy and/or radiotherapy cancer treatments to the head and neck. Additionally, the efficacy of MuGard for the prevention or treatment of mucositis has been tested by a prospective, randomized clinical trial in which 43% of head and neck cancer patients using MuGard prophylactically never got oral mucositis. NeutraSal is an FDA-cleared calcium phosphate mouth rinse that has been shown in an open-label, observational registry trial to prevent and reduce the severity of oral mucositis caused by radiation and high-dose chemotherapy. In the trial, 56% of the radiotherapy patients reported 0 (WHO score) or no mucositis, which is significantly lower than historical rates. Another super saturated calcium phosphate rinse on the market and cleared by the FDA is the US based SalivaMAX. The Mayo Clinic has been testing the antidepressant doxepin in a mouthwash to help treat symptoms.

In 2011, the FDA cleared episil oral liquid for the management and relief of pain of oral lesions with various etiologies, including oral mucositis/stomatitis which may be caused by chemotherapy or radiation therapy. The transformative mechanism of action of episil creates a lipid membrane that mechanically bonds to the oral cavity mucosa to coat and soothe inflammation and ulcerations, and blanket painful lesions. In a multicenter, randomized, double-blind, single-dose study involving 38 head and neck cancer patients with oral mucositis (WHO grades 2-3) undergoing radiation therapy, episil clinically demonstrated fast-acting relief that lasted up to 8 hours. Episil oral liquid is marketed in the US by Cangene.

In a 2012 randomized controlled pilot study involving pediatric patients, topical application of honey was found to reduce recovery time compared to benzocaine gel in grade 2 and 3 chemotherapy-induced oral mucositis to a degree that was statistically significant. In grade 3 oral mucositis, honey was as effective as a mixture of honey, olive oil and propolis, while both treatments were found to reduce recovery time compared to the benzocaine control.

Clinical research is ongoing in oral mucositis. A recent phase 2 exploratory trial in oral mucositis reported that dusquetide, a unique innate immune modulator with a mechanism that potentially addresses each of the phases of OM pathophysiology, is able to reduce the duration of severe oral mucositis, as well as reducing the incidence of infection

== See also ==
- Stomatitis

== General sources ==
- Mucositis Resource Center of the MASCC/ISOO Mucositis Study Group. Medical journal articles, guidelines, recommendations, and slides and videos from conference presentations.
