= Tumor-informed metabolism =

Relationship between metabolism and specific types of cancer

Tumor-informed metabolism (TIM) is an approach in oncology that tailors dietary interventions to the specific metabolic characteristics of a patient's tumor, the treatments they receive, and their physiology. It aims to enhance therapeutic outcomes by modulating nutrient availability to restrict tumor growth while supporting patient health.

Cancer cells reprogram metabolism to support proliferation, often showing dependencies on nutrients such as glucose, amino acids, or lipids. Dietary modifications target these dependencies, reducing circulating factors such as insulin or IGF-1, or depleting specific substrates. Unlike generic diets, this method applies precision nutrition to complement drugs, reducing metabolic resistance. It positions diet as a co-therapeutic tool alongside surgery, chemotherapy, radiation, and immunotherapy.

As of 2026, preclinical models support its potential, with clinical trials underway for cancers including breast and colorectal.

== Metabolic reprogramming in cancer ==
Cancer cells alter metabolism to meet demands for energy and biosynthesis. They increase glucose uptake and glycolysis, even with oxygen present, known as aerobic glycolysis. Glutamine supports the TCA cycle and redox balance. These changes create vulnerabilities; for example, some tumors rely on specific amino acids for survival. Tumor type, genetics, and the tumor microenvironment influence these traits. Kras mutations upregulate serine synthesis in pancreatic cancer, making restriction ineffective there but useful elsewhere. Precision approaches map these dependencies to guide interventions.

== Principles ==
Tumor-informed metabolism matches diet to tumor biology. It treats food as a targeted input, closing escape paths from drugs. Strategies include caloric restriction, ketogenic diets, fasting-mimicking diets, and amino acid depletion. Caloric restriction lowers glucose and activates autophagy. Ketogenic diets shift to fat metabolism, reducing insulin. Amino acid restriction exploits dependencies, such as methionine for methylation. Patients time interventions around therapy sessions to enhance efficacy.

== History ==
Siddhartha Mukherjee introduced the term in a 2025 article, advocating for precision over generic diets. Early work on cancer metabolism dates to Warburg in the 1920s. Preclinical studies on dietary restriction emerged in the 2010s. By 2023, reviews highlighted tumor-specific potential. In 2022, Faeth Therapeutics began trials pairing diets with inhibitors. As of 2026, ongoing trials test combinations in endometrial and rectal cancers.

== Research ==
Studies report dietary impacts on tumor metabolism. Preclinical evidence dominates, with emerging clinical data.

=== Breast cancer ===
Fasting-mimicking diets synergize with endocrine therapy in mouse models, reducing IGF-1. Ketogenic diets enhance radio-chemo in xenografts. For PIK3CA-mutant cases, low-glycemic diets blunt insulin spikes from inhibitors. Trials like DIRECT assess fasting with CDK4/6 inhibitors.

=== Colorectal cancer ===
Methionine restriction augments 5-FU in mouse models by altering one-carbon metabolism. Serine/glycine depletion delays growth in biguanide-treated cases. Fructose restriction limits glycolysis in Apc models. Amino acid-restricted diets pair with radiation in trials.

=== Lung cancer ===
Ketogenic diets disrupt PI3K resistance in mouse models. Mannose supplementation inhibits glycolysis in low-PMI tumors.

=== Pancreatic cancer ===
Ketogenic diets enhance PI3K inhibition. Serine/glycine restriction fails due to Kras-driven synthesis.

=== Leukemia ===
Asparagine depletion targets dependency. Caloric restriction improves chemo in xenografts. Histidine boosts methotrexate sensitivity.

=== Other cancers ===
In prostate cancer, cysteine depletion increases ROS. In liver, BCAA aids survival post-therapy. Arginine depletion targets urea defects.

== Safety profile ==
Interventions risk weight loss or weakness if mismatched. Monitoring biomarkers ensures safety. For wasting patients, added calories preserve strength.

== Potential applications ==
TIM suits tumors with defined dependencies, enhancing drugs like PI3K inhibitors. Future includes computational models for predictions. Equity demands accessible plans.

== See also ==
- Cancer metabolism
- Precision medicine
