= Spinnbarkeit =

Biomedical rheology term

Spinnbarkeit (English: spinnability), also known as fibrosity, is a biomedical rheology term which refers to the stringy or stretchy property found to varying degrees in mucus, saliva, albumen and similar viscoelastic fluids. The term is used especially with reference to cervical mucus at the time just prior to or during ovulation.

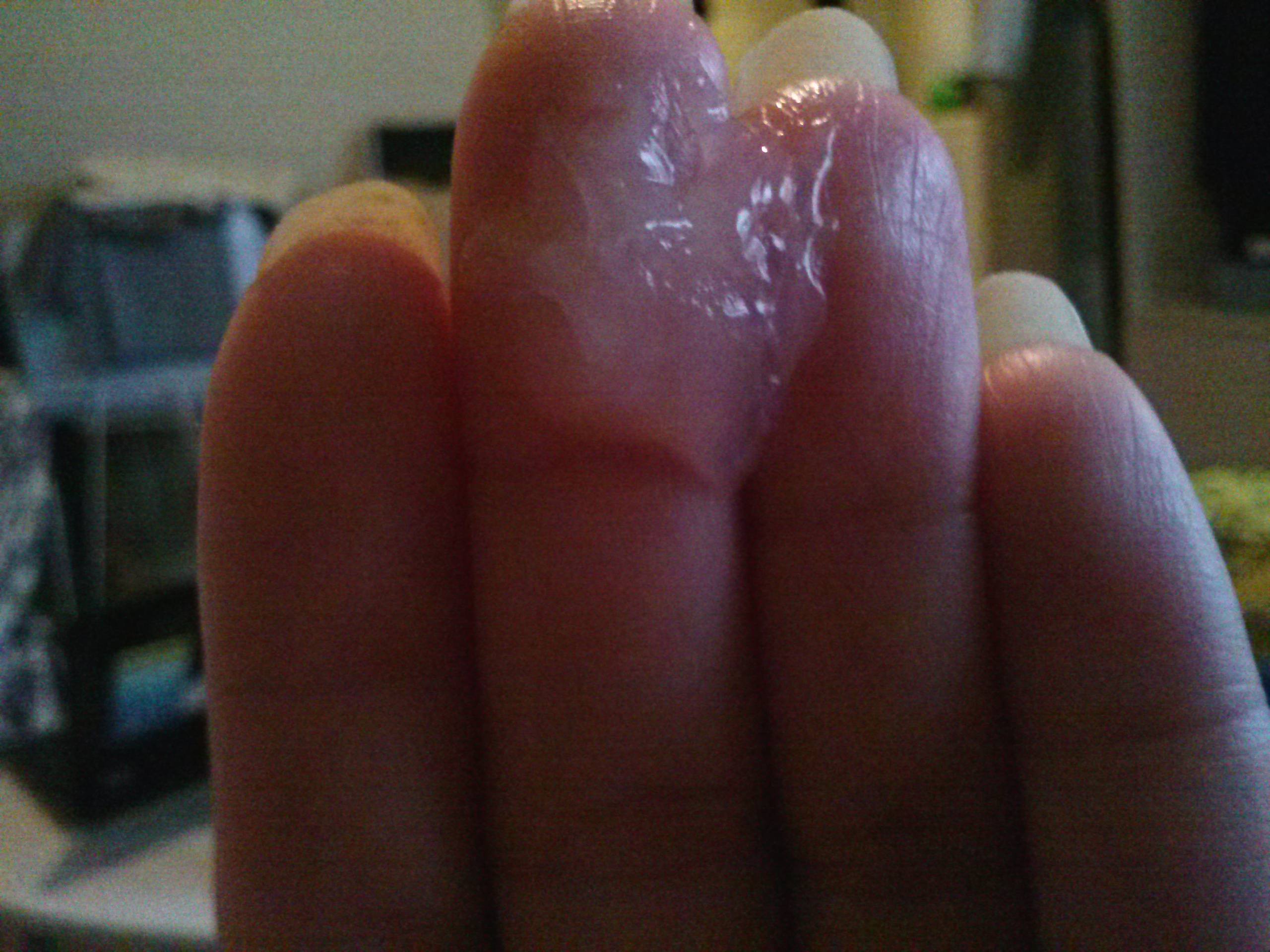
Fertile Cervical Mucus

Under the influence of estrogens, cervical mucus becomes abundant, clear, and stretchable, and somewhat like egg white. The stretchability of the mucus is described by its spinnbarkeit, from the German word for the ability to be spun. Only such mucus appears to be able to be penetrated by sperm. After ovulation, the character of cervical mucus changes, and under the influence of progesterone it becomes thick, scant, and tacky. Sperm typically cannot penetrate it.

Saliva does not always exhibit spinnbarkeit, but it can under certain circumstances. The thickness and spinnbarkeit of nasal mucus are factors in whether or not the nose seems to be blocked.

Mucociliary transport depends on the interaction of fibrous mucus with beating cilia.

== See also ==
- Mucorrhea
