= Mouthwash =

Liquid rinse for oral hygiene

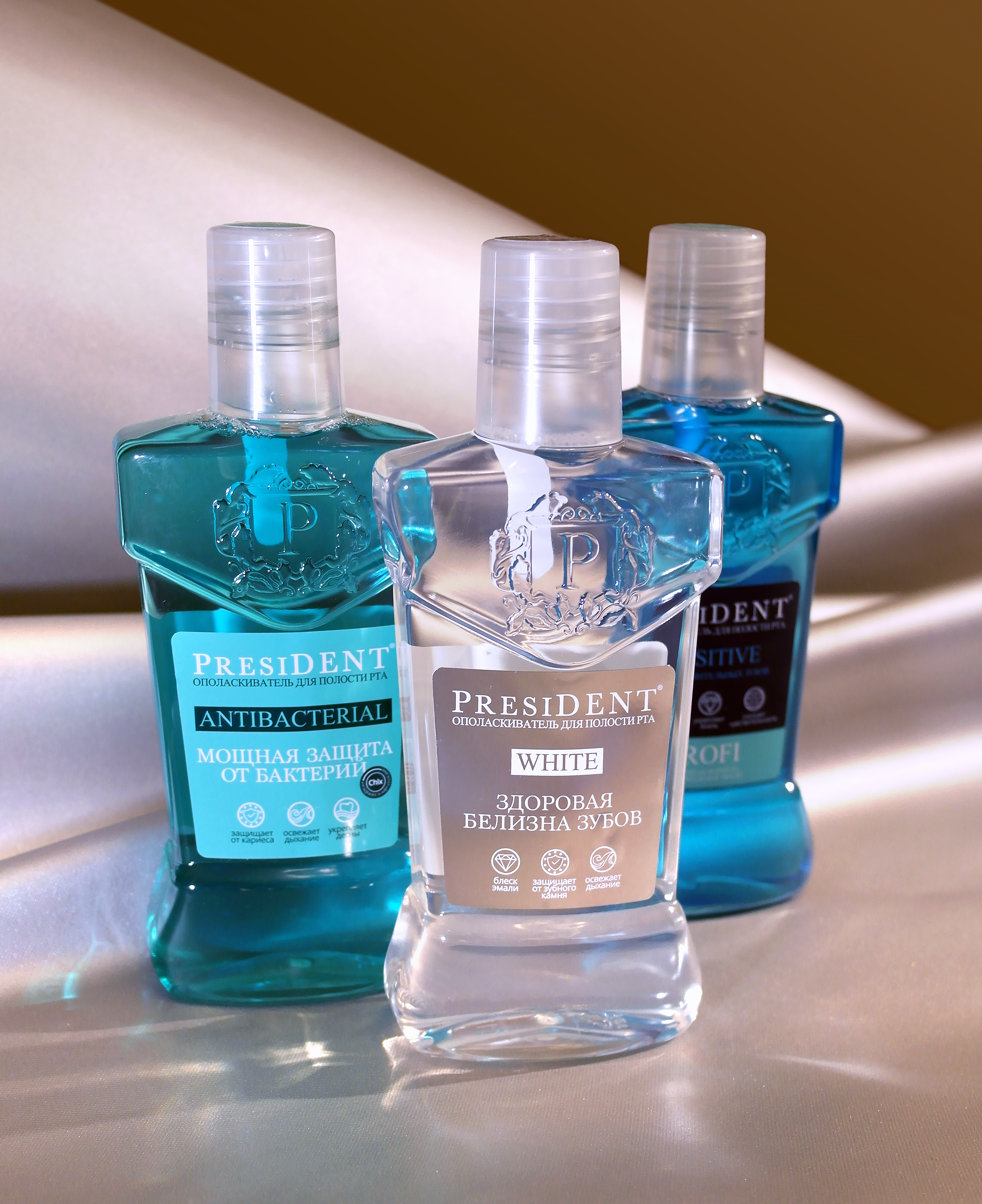
Range of mouthwashes

Mouthwash, mouth rinse, oral rinse, or mouth bath is a liquid which is held in the mouth passively or swirled around the mouth by contraction of the perioral muscles and/or movement of the head, and may be gargled, where the head is tilted back and the liquid bubbled at the back of the mouth.

Usually mouthwashes are antiseptic solutions intended to reduce the microbial load in the mouth, although other mouthwashes might be given for other reasons such as for their analgesic, anti-inflammatory or anti-fungal action. Additionally, some rinses act as saliva substitutes to neutralize acid and keep the mouth moist in xerostomia (dry mouth). Cosmetic mouthrinses temporarily control or reduce bad breath and leave the mouth with a pleasant taste.

Rinsing with water or mouthwash after brushing with a fluoride toothpaste can reduce the availability of salivary fluoride. This can lower the anti-cavity re-mineralization and antibacterial effects of fluoride. Fluoridated mouthwash may mitigate this effect or in high concentrations increase available fluoride, but is not as cost-effective as leaving the fluoride toothpaste on the teeth after brushing. A group of experts discussing post brushing rinsing in 2012 found that although there was clear guidance given in many public health advice publications to "spit, avoid rinsing with water/excessive rinsing with water" they believed there was a limited evidence base for best practice.

== Use ==
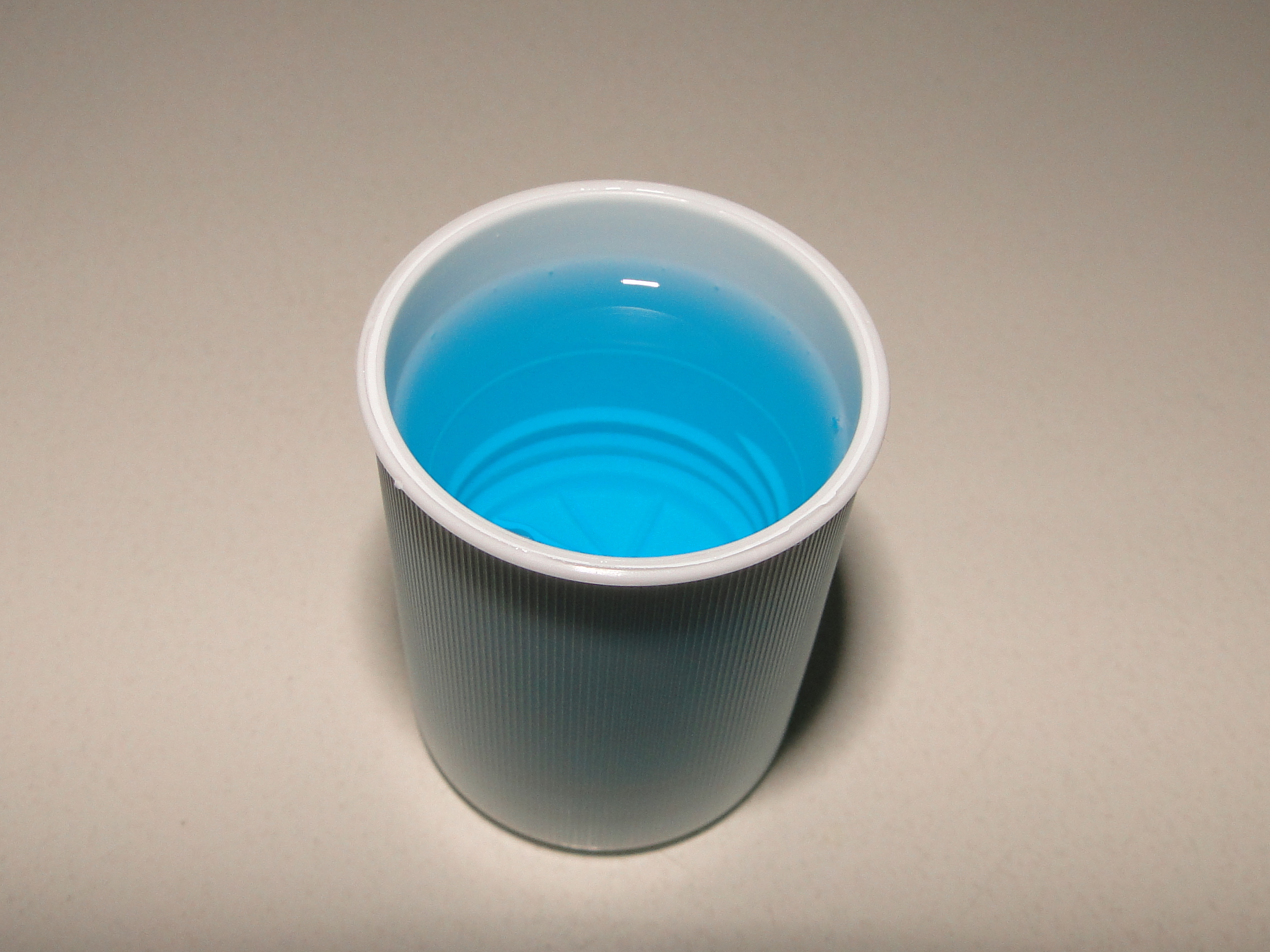
An amount of mouthwash suitable for rinsing, poured into the cap of a bottle

Common use involves rinsing the mouth with about 20–50 ml (0.7–1.7 US fl oz) of mouthwash. The wash is typically swished or gargled for about half a minute and then spat out. Most companies suggest not drinking water immediately after using mouthwash. In some brands, the expectorate is stained, so that one can see the bacteria and debris. Mouthwash should not be used immediately after brushing the teeth so as not to wash away the beneficial fluoride residue left from the toothpaste. Similarly, the mouth should not be rinsed out with water after brushing. Patients were told to "spit don't rinse" after toothbrushing as part of a National Health Service campaign in the UK. A fluoride mouthrinse can be used at a different time of the day to brushing.

Gargling is where the head is tilted back, allowing the mouthwash to sit in the back of the mouth while exhaling, causing the liquid to bubble. Gargling is practiced in Japan for perceived prevention of viral infection. One commonly used way is with infusions or tea. In some cultures, gargling is usually done in private, typically in a bathroom at a sink so the liquid can be rinsed away.

Serious harm and even death can quickly result from ingestion due to the high alcohol content and other substances harmful to ingestion present in some brands of mouthwash. Zero percent alcohol mouthwashes do exist, as well as many other formulations for different needs (covered in the following sections).

These risks may be higher in toddlers and young children if they are allowed to use toothpaste and/or mouthwash unsupervised, where they may swallow it. Misuse in this way can be avoided with parental admission or supervision and by using child-safe forms or a children's brand of mouthwash.

Surrogate alcohol use such as ingestion of mouthwash is a common cause of death among homeless due to the inclusion of toxic substances in these products.

== Effects ==
The most commonly used mouthwashes are commercial antiseptics, which are used at home as part of an oral hygiene routine. Mouthwashes combine ingredients to treat a variety of oral conditions. Variations are common, and mouthwash has no standard formulation, so its use and recommendation involves concerns about patient safety. Some manufacturers of mouthwash state that their antiseptic and antiplaque mouthwashes kill the bacterial plaque that causes cavities, gingivitis, and bad breath. It is, however, generally agreed that the use of mouthwash does not eliminate the need for both brushing and flossing. The American Dental Association asserts that regular brushing and proper flossing are enough in most cases, in addition to regular dental check-ups, although they approve many mouthwashes. For many patients, however, the mechanical methods could be tedious and time-consuming, and, additionally, some local conditions may render them especially difficult. Chemotherapeutic agents, including mouthwashes, could have a key role as adjuncts to daily home care, preventing and controlling supragingival plaque, gingivitis and oral malodor.

Minor and transient side effects of mouthwashes are very common, such as taste disturbance, tooth staining, sensation of a dry mouth, etc. Alcohol-containing mouthwashes may make dry mouth and halitosis worse, as they dry out the mouth. Soreness, ulceration and redness may sometimes occur (e.g., aphthous stomatitis or allergic contact stomatitis) if the person is allergic or sensitive to mouthwash ingredients, such as preservatives, coloring, flavors and fragrances. Such effects might be reduced or eliminated by diluting the mouthwash with water, using a different mouthwash (e.g. saltwater), or foregoing mouthwash entirely.

Prescription mouthwashes are used prior to and after oral surgery procedures, such as tooth extraction, or to treat the pain associated with mucositis caused by radiation therapy or chemotherapy. They are also prescribed for aphthous ulcers, other oral ulcers, and other mouth pain.

"Magic mouthwash", also known as "magic swizzle", is a prescription mouthwash compounded in a pharmacy from a list of ingredients specified by a doctor. Ingredients and formulations vary. Despite a lack of evidence that prescription mouthwashes are more effective in decreasing the pain of oral lesions, many patients and prescribers continue to use them. There has been only one controlled study to evaluate the efficacy of magic mouthwash; it shows no difference in efficacy between the most common magic-mouthwash formulation, on the one hand, and commercial mouthwashes (such as chlorhexidine) or a saline/baking soda solution, on the other. Current guidelines suggest that saline solution is just as effective as magic mouthwash in pain relief and in shortening the healing time of oral mucositis from cancer therapies.

Beyond the sanitization effects, the use of antiseptic mouthwash can disrupt the oral microbiome and interfere with the regulated production of nitric oxide (NO), which in turn increase cardiovascular, and Alzheimer's disease health risks.

== History ==
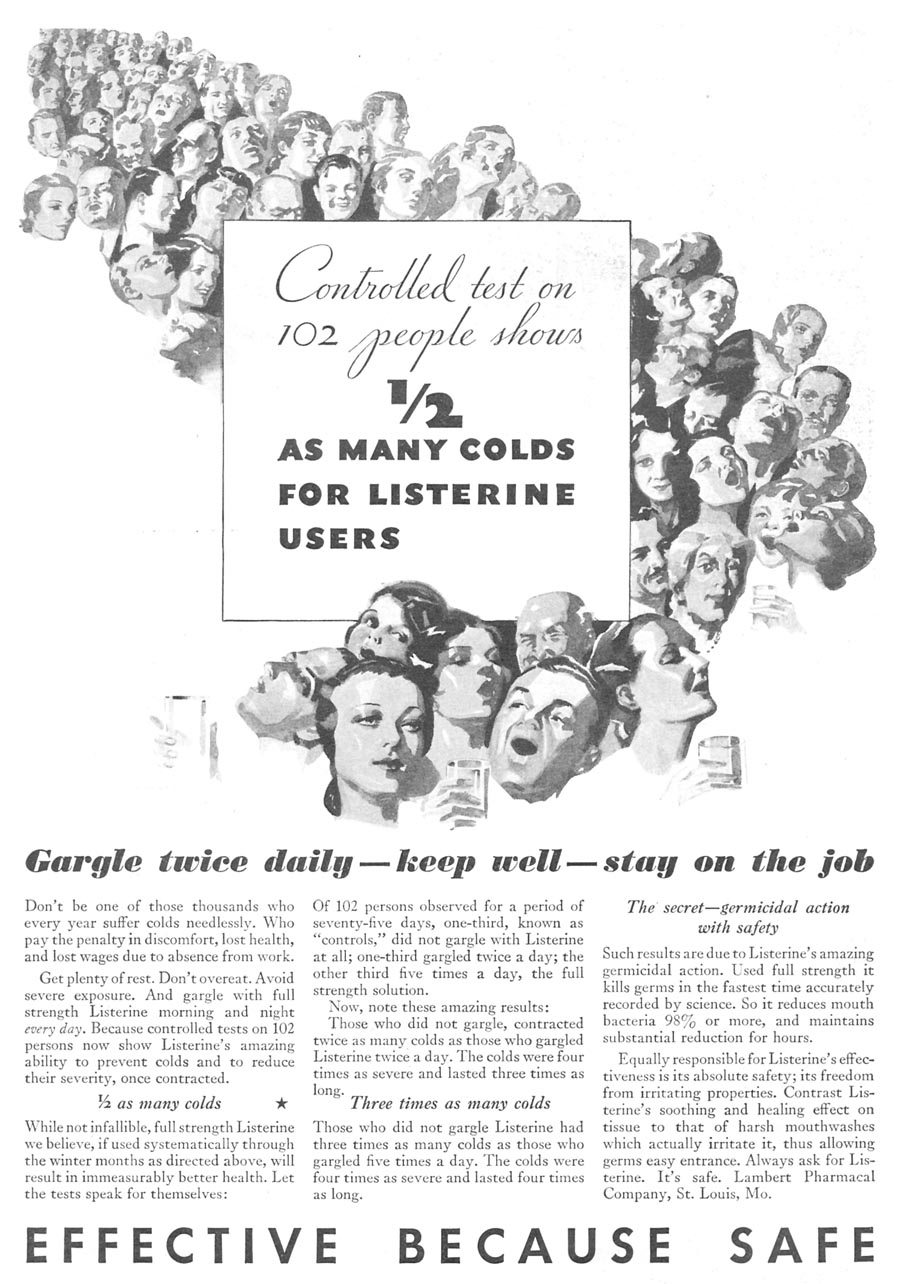
Listerine advertisement, 1932

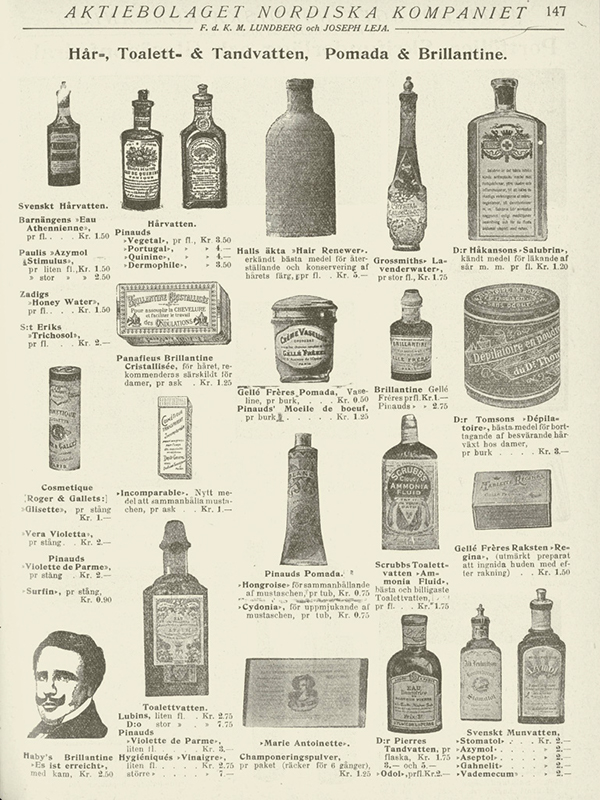
Swedish ad for toiletries, 1905/1906

The use of mouth rinses for health and disease is ancient and the literature is difficult to date precisely. The Huangdi Neijing is said to have been written around 2600-2700 BC and advises treating gingivitis or periodontis by using the urine of a child as a mouth wash. Ayurveda practices such as oil pulling are said to date to 3000-5000 years ago. for treatment of gingivitis. However, both of these practices are semi-mythical and specialists generally date this literature to around 200-300 BC. The ancient Chinese also gargled salt water, tea and wine as a form of mouthwash after meals, due to the antiseptic properties of those liquids, as recounted by the Shiji written circa 94 BCE.

In the Greek and Roman periods, mouth rinsing following mechanical cleansing became common among the upper classes, and Hippocrates recommended a mixture of salt, alum, and vinegar (460-377 BCE). The Jewish Talmud, dating to 50 - 500 CE, suggests a cure for gum ailments containing "dough water" and olive oil.

Before Europeans came to the Americas, Native North American and Mesoamerican cultures used mouthwashes, often made from plants such as Coptis trifolia. Peoples of the Americas used salt water mouthwashes for sore throats, and other mouthwashes for problems such as teething and mouth ulcers.

Anton van Leeuwenhoek, the famous 17th century microscopist, discovered living organisms (living, because they were mobile) in deposits on the teeth (what we now call dental plaque). He also found organisms in water from the canal next to his home in Delft. He experimented with samples by adding vinegar or brandy and found that this resulted in the immediate immobilization or killing of the organisms suspended in water. Next he tried rinsing the mouth of himself and somebody else with a mouthwash containing vinegar or brandy and found that living organisms remained in the dental plaque. He concluded—correctly—that the mouthwash either did not reach, or was not present long enough, to kill the plaque organisms. In 1892, German Richard Seifert invented mouthwash product Odol, which was produced by company founder Karl August Lingner (1861–1916) in Dresden.

That remained the state of affairs until the late 1960s when Harald Loe (at the time a professor at the Royal Dental College in Aarhus, Denmark) demonstrated that a chlorhexidine compound could prevent the build-up of dental plaque. The reason for chlorhexidine's effectiveness is that it strongly adheres to surfaces in the mouth and thus remains present in effective concentrations for many hours.

Since then commercial interest in mouthwashes has been intense and several newer products claim effectiveness in reducing the build-up in dental plaque and the associated severity of gingivitis, in addition to fighting bad breath. For example, the number of mouthwash variants in the United States of America has grown from 15 (1970) to 66 (1998) to 113 (2012). Many of these solutions aim to control the volatile sulfur compound–creating anaerobic bacteria that live in the mouth and excrete substances that lead to bad breath and unpleasant mouth taste.

== Research ==
Research in the field of microbiotas shows that only a limited set of microbes cause tooth decay, with most of the bacteria in the human mouth being harmless. Focused attention on cavity-causing bacteria such as Streptococcus mutans has led research into new mouthwash treatments that prevent these bacteria from initially growing. While current mouthwash treatments must be used with a degree of frequency to prevent this bacteria from regrowing, future treatments could provide a viable long-term solution.

A clinical trial and laboratory studies have shown that alcohol-containing mouthwash could reduce the growth of Neisseria gonorrhoeae in the pharynx. However, subsequent trials have found that there was no difference in gonorrhoea cases among men using daily mouthwash compared to those who did not use mouthwash for 12 weeks.

== Ingredients ==
=== Alcohol ===
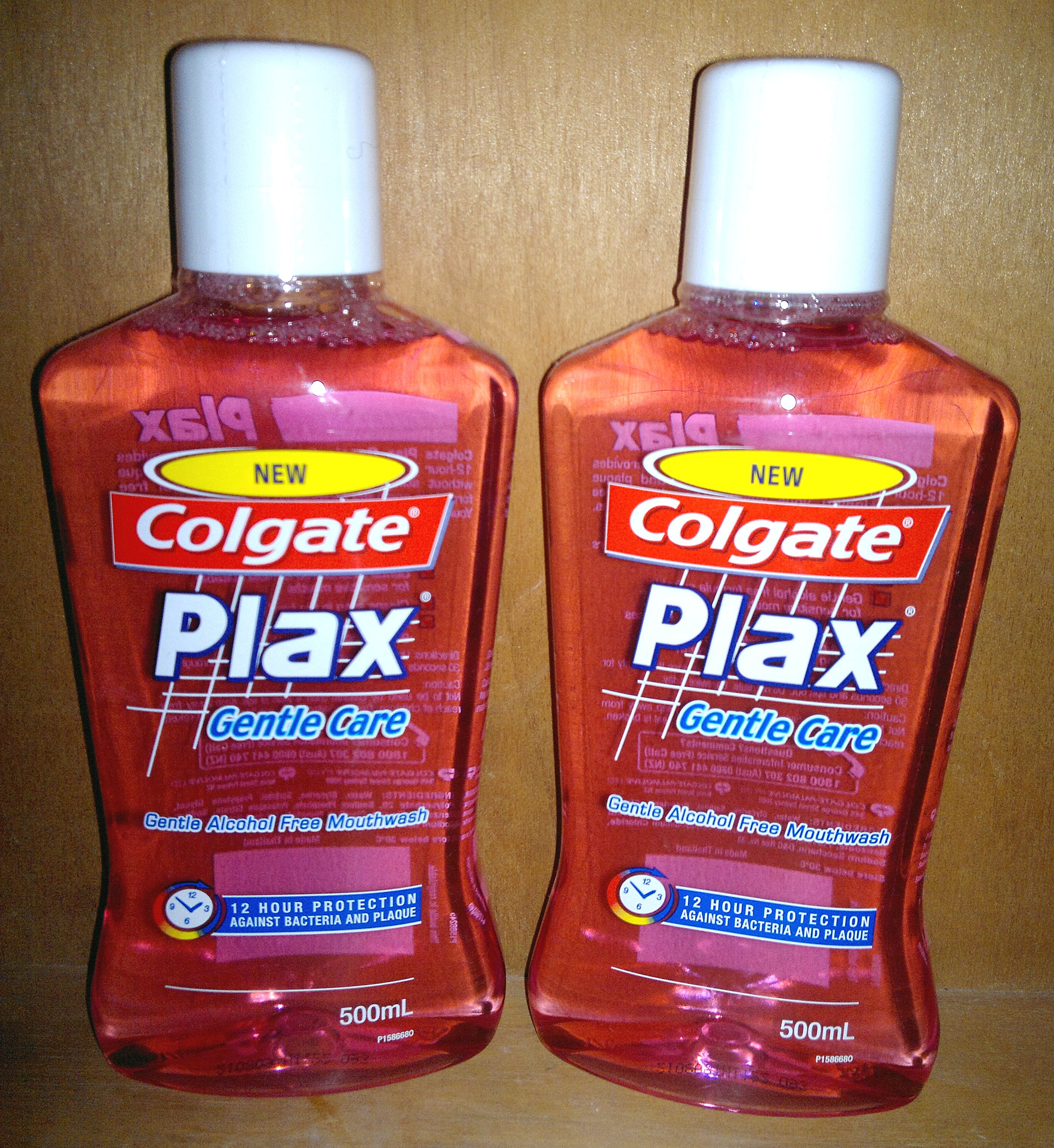
An example of a commercial mouthwash brand which is alcohol-free

Alcohol is added to mouthwash not to destroy bacteria but to act as a carrier agent for essential active ingredients such as menthol, eucalyptol and thymol, which help to penetrate plaque. Sometimes a significant amount of alcohol (up to 27% vol) is added, as a carrier for the flavor, to provide "bite". Because of the alcohol content, it is possible to fail a breathalyzer test after rinsing, although breath alcohol levels return to normal after 10 minutes. In addition, alcohol is a drying agent, which encourages bacterial activity in the mouth, releasing more malodorous volatile sulfur compounds. Therefore, alcohol-containing mouthwash may temporarily worsen halitosis in those who already have it, or, indeed, be the sole cause of halitosis in other individuals. Alcohol in mouthwashes may act as a carcinogen (cancer-inducing agent) in some cases. Many newer brands of mouthwash are alcohol-free, not just in response to consumer concerns about oral cancer, but also to cater for religious groups who abstain from alcohol consumption.

=== Benzydamine (analgesic) ===
In painful oral conditions such as aphthous stomatitis, analgesic mouthrinses (e.g. benzydamine mouthwash, or "Difflam") are sometimes used to ease pain, commonly used before meals to reduce discomfort while eating.

=== Benzoic acid ===
Benzoic acid acts as a buffer.

=== Betamethasone ===
Betamethasone is sometimes used as an anti-inflammatory, corticosteroid mouthwash. It may be used for severe inflammatory conditions of the oral mucosa such as the severe forms of aphthous stomatitis.

=== Cetylpyridinium chloride (antiseptic, antimalodor) ===
Cetylpyridinium chloride containing mouthwash (e.g. 0.05%) is used in some specialized mouthwashes for halitosis. Cetylpyridinium chloride mouthwash has less anti-plaque effect than chlorhexidine and may cause staining of teeth, or sometimes an oral burning sensation or ulceration.

=== Chlorhexidine digluconate and hexetidine (antiseptic) ===
Chlorhexidine digluconate is a chemical antiseptic and is used in a 0.05–0.2% solution as a mouthwash. There is no evidence to support that higher concentrations are more effective in controlling dental plaque and gingivitis. A randomized clinical trial conducted in Rabat University in Morocco found better results in plaque inhibition when chlorohexidine with alcohol base 0.12% was used, when compared to an alcohol-free 0.1% chlorhexidine mouthrinse.

Chlorhexidine has good substantivity (the ability of a mouthwash to bind to hard and soft tissues in the mouth). It has anti-plaque action, and also some anti-fungal action. It is especially effective against Gram-negative rods. The proportion of Gram-negative rods increase as gingivitis develops, so it is also used to reduce gingivitis. It is sometimes used as an adjunct to prevent dental caries and to treat periodontal disease, although it does not penetrate into periodontal pockets well. Chlorhexidine mouthwash alone is unable to prevent plaque, so it is not a substitute for regular toothbrushing and flossing. Instead, chlorhexidine mouthwash is more effective when used as an adjunctive treatment with toothbrushing and flossing. In the short term, if toothbrushing is impossible due to pain, as may occur in primary herpetic gingivostomatitis, chlorhexidine mouthwash is used as a temporary substitute for other oral hygiene measures. It is not suited for use in acute necrotizing ulcerative gingivitis, however. Rinsing with chlorhexidine mouthwash before and after a tooth extraction may reduce the risk of a dry socket. Other uses of chlorhexidine mouthwash include prevention of oral candidiasis in immunocompromised persons, treatment of denture-related stomatitis, mucosal ulceration/erosions and oral mucosal lesions, general burning sensation and many other uses.

Chlorhexidine mouthwash is known to have minor adverse effects. Chlorhexidine binds to tannins, meaning that prolonged use in persons who consume coffee, tea or red wine is associated with extrinsic staining (i.e. removable staining) of teeth. A systematic review of commercial chlorhexidine products with anti-discoloration systems (ADSs) found that the ADSs were able to reduce tooth staining without affecting the beneficial effects of chlorhexidine. Chlorhexidine mouthwash can also cause taste disturbance or alteration. Chlorhexidine is rarely associated with other issues like overgrowth of enterobacteria in persons with leukemia, desquamation, irritation, and stomatitis of oral mucosa, salivary gland pain and swelling, and hypersensitivity reactions including anaphylaxis.

Hexetidine also has anti-plaque, analgesic, astringent and anti-malodor properties, but is considered an inferior alternative to chlorhexidine.

=== Chlorine dioxide ===
In dilute concentrations, chlorine dioxide is an ingredient that acts as an antiseptic agent in some mouthwashes.

=== Edible oils ===
In traditional Ayurvedic medicine, the use of oil mouthwashes is called "Kavala" ("oil swishing") or "Gandusha", and this practice has more recently been re-marketed by the complementary and alternative medicine industry as "oil pulling". Its promoters claim it works by "pulling out" "toxins", which are known as ama in Ayurvedic medicine, and thereby reducing inflammation. Ayurvedic literature claims that oil pulling is capable of improving oral and systemic health, including a benefit in conditions such as headaches, migraines, diabetes mellitus, asthma, and acne, as well as whitening teeth.

Oil pulling has received little study and there is little evidence to support claims made by the technique's advocates. When compared with chlorhexidine in one small study, it was found to be less effective at reducing oral bacterial load, and the other health claims of oil pulling have failed scientific verification or have not been investigated. There is a report of lipid pneumonia caused by accidental inhalation of the oil during oil pulling.

The mouth is rinsed with approximately one tablespoon of oil for 10–20 minutes then spat out. Sesame oil, coconut oil and ghee are traditionally used, but newer oils such as sunflower oil are also used.

=== Essential oils ===
Phenolic compounds and monoterpenes include essential oil constituents that have some antibacterial properties, such as eucalyptol, eugenol, hinokitiol, menthol, phenol, or thymol. Essential oils are oils which have been extracted from plants. Mouthwashes based on essential oils could be more effective than traditional mouthcare as anti-gingival treatments. They have been found effective in reducing halitosis, and are being used in several commercial mouthwashes.

=== Fluoride (anticavity) ===
Anti-cavity mouthwashes contain fluoride compounds (such as sodium fluoride, stannous fluoride, or sodium monofluorophosphate) to protect against tooth decay. Fluoride-containing mouthwashes are used as prevention for dental caries for individuals who are considered at higher risk for tooth decay, whether due to xerostomia related to salivary dysfunction or side effects of medication, to not drinking fluoridated water, or to being physically unable to care for their oral needs (brushing and flossing), and as treatment for those with dentinal hypersensitivity, gingival recession/ root exposure.

=== Flavoring agents and xylitol ===
Flavoring agents include sweeteners such as sorbitol, sucralose, sodium saccharin, and xylitol, which stimulate salivary function due to their sweetness and taste and helps restore the mouth to a neutral level of acidity.

Xylitol rinses double as a bacterial inhibitor, and have been used as substitute for alcohol to avoid dryness of mouth associated with alcohol.

=== Hydrogen peroxide ===
Hydrogen peroxide can be used as an oxidizing mouthwash (e.g. Peroxyl, 1.5%). It kills anaerobic bacteria, and also has a mechanical cleansing action when it froths as it comes into contact with debris in mouth. It is often used in the short term to treat acute necrotising ulcerative gingivitis. Side effects can occur with prolonged use, including hypertrophy of the lingual papillae.

=== Lactoperoxidase (saliva substitute) ===
Enzymes and non-enzymatic proteins, such as lactoperoxidase, lysozyme, and lactoferrin, have been used in mouthwashes (e.g., Biotene) to reduce levels of oral bacteria, and, hence, of the acids produced by these bacteria.

=== Lidocaine/xylocaine ===
Oral lidocaine is useful for the treatment of mucositis symptoms (inflammation of mucous membranes) induced by radiation or chemotherapy. There is evidence that lidocaine anesthetic mouthwash has the potential to be systemically absorbed, when it was tested in patients with oral mucositis who underwent a bone marrow transplant.

=== Methyl salicylate ===
Methyl salicylate functions as an antiseptic, antiinflammatory, and analgesic agent, a flavoring, and a fragrance. Methyl salicylate has some anti-plaque action, but less than chlorhexidine. Methyl salicylate does not stain teeth.

=== Nystatin ===
Nystatin suspension is an antifungal ingredient used for the treatment of oral candidiasis.

=== Potassium oxalate ===
A randomized clinical trial found promising results in controlling and reducing dentine hypersensitivity when potassium oxalate mouthwash was used in conjugation with toothbrushing.

=== Povidone/iodine (PVP-I) ===
A 2005 study found that gargling three times a day with simple water or with a povidone-iodine solution was effective in preventing upper respiratory infection and decreasing the severity of symptoms if contracted. Other sources attribute the benefit to a simple placebo effect.

PVP-I in general covers "a wider virucidal spectrum, covering both enveloped and nonenveloped viruses, than the other commercially available antiseptics", which also includes the novel SARS-CoV-2 virus.

=== Sanguinarine ===
Sanguinarine-containing mouthwashes are marketed as anti-plaque and anti-malodor treatments. Sanguinarine is a toxic alkaloid herbal extract, obtained from plants such as Sanguinaria canadensis (bloodroot), Argemone mexicana (Mexican prickly poppy), and others. However, its use is strongly associated with the development of leukoplakia (a white patch in the mouth), usually in the buccal sulcus. This type of leukoplakia has been termed "sanguinaria-associated keratosis", and more than 80% of people with leukoplakia in the vestibule of the mouth have used this substance. Upon stopping contact with the causative substance, the lesions may persist for years. Although this type of leukoplakia may show dysplasia, the potential for malignant transformation is unknown. Ironically, elements within the complementary and alternative medicine industry promote the use of sanguinaria as a therapy for cancer.

=== Sodium bicarbonate (baking soda) ===
Sodium bicarbonate is sometimes combined with salt to make a simple homemade mouthwash, indicated for any of the reasons that a saltwater mouthwash might be used. Pre-mixed mouthwashes of 1% sodium bicarbonate and 1.5% sodium chloride in aqueous solution are marketed, although pharmacists will easily be able to produce such a formulation from the base ingredients when required. Sodium bicarbonate mouthwash is sometimes used to remove viscous saliva and to aid visualization of the oral tissues during examination of the mouth.

=== Sodium chloride (salt) ===
Saline has a mechanical cleansing action and an antiseptic action, as it is a hypertonic solution in relation to bacteria, which undergo lysis. The heat of the solution produces a therapeutic increase in blood flow (hyperemia) to the surgical site, promoting healing. Hot saltwater mouthwashes also encourage the draining of pus from dental abscesses. In contrast, if heat is applied on the side of the face (e.g., hot water bottle) rather than inside the mouth, it may cause a dental abscess to drain extra-orally, which is later associated with an area of fibrosis on the face.

Saltwater mouthwashes are also routinely used after oral surgery, to keep food debris out of healing wounds and to prevent infection. Some oral surgeons consider saltwater mouthwashes the mainstay of wound cleanliness after surgery. In dental extractions, hot saltwater mouthbaths should start about 24 hours after a dental extraction. The term mouth bath implies that the liquid is passively held in the mouth, rather than vigorously swilled around (which could dislodge a blood clot). Once the blood clot has stabilized, the mouthwash can be used more vigorously. These mouthwashes tend to be advised for use about 6 times per day, especially after meals (to remove food from the socket).

=== Sodium lauryl sulfate (foaming agent) ===
Sodium lauryl sulfate (SLS) is used as a foaming agent in many oral hygiene products, including many mouthwashes. Some may suggest that it is probably advisable to use mouthwash at least an hour after brushing with toothpaste when the toothpaste contains SLS, since the anionic compounds in the SLS toothpaste can deactivate cationic agents present in the mouthwash.

=== Sucralfate ===
Sucralfate is a mucosal coating agent, composed of an aluminum salt of sulfated sucrose. It is not recommended for use in the prevention of oral mucositis in head and neck cancer patients receiving radiotherapy or chemoradiation, due to a lack of efficacy found in a well-designed, randomized controlled trial.

=== Tetracycline (antibiotic) ===
Tetracycline is an antibiotic which may sometimes be used as a mouthwash in adults (it causes red staining of teeth in children). It is sometimes use for herpetiforme ulceration (an uncommon type of aphthous stomatitis), but prolonged use may lead to oral candidiasis, as the fungal population of the mouth overgrows in the absence of enough competing bacteria. Similarly, minocycline mouthwashes of 0.5% concentrations can relieve symptoms of recurrent aphthous stomatitis. Erythromycin is similar.

=== Tranexamic acid ===
A 4.8% tranexamic acid solution is sometimes used as an antifibrinolytic mouthwash to prevent bleeding during and after oral surgery in persons with coagulopathies (clotting disorders) or who are taking anticoagulants (blood thinners such as warfarin).

=== Triclosan ===
Triclosan is a non-ionic chlorinate bisphenol antiseptic found in some mouthwashes. When used in mouthwash (e.g. 0.03%), there is moderate substantivity, broad spectrum anti-bacterial action, some anti-fungal action, and significant anti-plaque effect, especially when combined with a copolymer or zinc citrate. Triclosan does not cause staining of the teeth. The safety of triclosan has been questioned.

=== Zinc ===
Zinc, when used in combination with other antiseptic agents, can limit the buildup of tartar.

== See also ==
- Sodium fluoride/malic acid
- Virucide
