= Multimodal cancer therapy =

Approach to cancer treatment

Multimodal cancer therapy, often referred to simply as multimodal therapy or multimodal cancer care, is an approach for treatment of cancer that combines radiation and chemotherapy or other multiple therapeutic modalities. For example, in the case of mesotheliomas, treatments combine modalities such as surgery, chemotherapy, immunotherapy, and radiotherapy. Multimodal treatments can often have synergistic effects leading to better clinical outcomes.

Diverse types of cancer can be treated via a multimodal approach, including non-small cell lung cancer and gastric cancer.

== See also ==
- Treatment of cancer

== Citations ==
- Brown, Martin J.; Mehta, M. P.; Nieder, Carsten (2006-08-06). Multimodal Concepts for Integration of Cytotoxic Drugs. Springer Science & Business Media. p. 329. ISBN 978-3-540-35662-2.
- Schlag, Peter M.; Stein, Ulrike S. (2007-10-20). Regional Cancer Therapy. Springer Science & Business Media. p. 6. ISBN 978-1-59745-225-0.
- Liebman, Marcia C.; Camp-Sorrell, Dawn (1996). Multimodal Therapy in Oncology Nursing. Mosby. p. 450. ISBN 978-0-8151-5422-8.
- Bartlett, David L. (2011-03-31). Surgical Oncology. JP Medical Ltd. p. 141. ISBN 978-93-5025-051-8.
- Polascik, Thomas J. (2017-02-22). Imaging and Focal Therapy of Early Prostate Cancer. Springer. p. 396. ISBN 978-3-319-49911-6.
