= Fructose intolerance =

Fructose intolerance may refer to:

- Fructose malabsorption, a digestive disorder of the small intestine in which the fructose carrier in enterocytes is deficient
- Hereditary fructose intolerance, a hereditary condition caused by a deficiency of liver enzymes that metabolise fructose
