= Julie Gralow =

American oncologist

- Medical career
- Profession: Medical Oncologist
- Field: Oncology
- Institutions: American Society of Clinical Oncology (ASCO)
- Research: Breast cancer

Julie R. Gralow is the Chief Medical Officer and Executive Vice President of the American Society of Clinical Oncology (ASCO). She is also the founder of the Women's Empowerment Cancer Advocacy Network (WE CAN), and a co-founder of Team Survivor Northwest. She was formerly the Jill Bennett Endowed Professor of Breast Medical Oncology at the University of Washington.

== Education ==
Gralow earned her bachelor's degree from Stanford University (1977–1981) and her medical degree from the University of Southern California School of Medicine (1984–1988). She completed her internal medicine residency at Brigham and Women's Hospital, Harvard Medical School (1988–1991), followed by a medical oncology fellowship at the University of Washington/Fred Hutchinson Cancer Research Center in Seattle (1992–1995).

== Career ==
Gralow held the position of Jill Bennett Endowed Professor of Breast Medical Oncology (1992–2021) and Professor of Global Health (2011–2021) at the University of Washington School of Medicine. She was also a member of the clinical research division at the Fred Hutchinson Cancer Research Center (1992–2021) and served as the director of breast medical oncology at the Seattle Cancer Care Alliance (2001–2021).

Since 2021, Gralow has been the Chief Medical Officer and Executive Vice President of the American Society of Clinical Oncology (ASCO). Before assuming this role, she held various volunteer and leadership positions within ASCO, including chair of the ASCO Academic Global Oncology Task Force, co-chair of the ASCO Resource-Stratified Guideline Advisory Group, and member of the editorial board for the European Society for Medical Oncology (ESMO)/ASCO Global Curriculum in Medical Oncology.

She has also been actively involved in several nonprofit organizations. In 1995, she co-founded Team Survivor Northwest, where she continues to serve as Team Physician. Additionally, she has been a medical advisory committee member for the Cierra Sisters African American Support Group, an advisory board member for Global Focus on Cancer, and a board member of Peace Island Medical Center, a rural access hospital in Washington State.

== Work ==
Gralow is known for her work advocating for cancer patients. In this role she has discussed medications for the treatment of cancer, including Avastin and Lorbrena. She has spoken to news sources and testified to United States Congress on supply chain issues for drugs used to treat cancer. Her interactions with national magazines includes discussions about side effects people may encounter during cancer treatment, and details on the types of tumors patients may experience. Her research includes investigating the role of exercise in cancer patients.

== Selected publications ==
- McTiernan, Anne; Gralow, Julie; Talbott, Lisa (2000). Breast fitness : an optimal exercise and health plan for reducing your risk of breast cancer. New York, NY: St. Martin's Press. ISBN 978-1-4668-7500-5. OCLC 882259033.
- Gralow, Julie (2007). Finding your way to wellness : Puget Sound breast cancer information & resource guide. Seattle, WA: Susan G. Komen for the Cure, Puget Sound Affiliate. OCLC 1244721266.

== Awards and honours ==
- American Society of Clinical Oncology (FASCO) (Statesman Award), (2008)
- ASCO Humanitarian Award, 2018, acknowledging significant efforts in improving cancer care and advocating for cancer patients globally, especially in low- and middle-income countries
- Giants of Cancer Care Recognition 2021
