= Chemoradiotherapy =

- Specialty: Oncology

Chemoradiotherapy (CRT, CRTx, CT-RT) is the combination of chemotherapy and radiotherapy to treat cancer. Synonyms include radiochemotherapy (RCT, RCTx, RT-CT) and chemoradiation. It is a type of multimodal cancer therapy.

Chemoradiation can be concurrent (together) or sequential (one after the other).

The chemotherapy component can be or include a radiosensitizing agent.

Chemoradiotherapy as neoadjuvant therapy before surgery has been shown to be effective in esophageal cancer.
