= Gum lift =

Cosmetic dental procedure

A gum lift (also known as a gingivectomy) is a cosmetic dental procedure that raises and sculpts the gum line. This procedure involves reshaping the tissue and/or underlying bones to create the appearance of longer or symmetrical teeth, thereby making the smile more aesthetically pleasing. This procedure is typically done to reduce excessively gummy smiles or to balance out an asymmetrical gum line. The procedure, also known as crown-lengthening, has historically been used to treat gum disease. It is only within the past three to five years that dentists have commonly used this procedure for aesthetic purposes. The practice of cosmetic gum lifts was first developed in the late 1980s, but there were few oral surgeons and dental practitioners available to perform the procedures. Gum lifts can also include bone shaping to reduce the prominence of the upper jaw and even out the tooth and gum ratio. This method provides permanent results, while simple gum contouring may result in relapse or regrowth of the gingiva.

== Causes of a gummy smile ==
The smile line relies on several factors, including the size and shape of the teeth, facial muscles, gum tissue, and the shape and size of the lips. Those same factors can cause a gummy smile. Gummy smiles occur because of:

- Abnormal tooth eruption: The teeth are normal length, but because of their abnormal eruption they appear shorter.
- Altered active eruption: The teeth erupt correctly, but are covered with too much bone and gum tissue.
- Altered passive eruption: The teeth and bone are within normal parameters, but the teeth are covered with excessive gum tissue.
- Upper jaw protrusion: During development of the jaw, the bone protrudes into the gum tissue, creating a gummy smile.
- Hyperactive upper lip: The upper lip is higher than normal, revealing too much gum.
- Hypermobile upper lip: When smiling, the facial muscles pull the top lip up too high, revealing too much gum.
- Short upper lip: The upper lip is too short, revealing too much gum.
- Vertical maxillary access: The vertical dimension of the upper jaw is longer than it should be.
- Super-eruption of the top front teeth: When the lower jaw is smaller than the upper jaw, the top teeth drift lower, pulling the gum tissue with them.
- Bruxism: Tooth grinding, or bruxism, wears away tooth structure, shortening the teeth. As a result, the upper teeth super-erupt, meaning they move down to come into contact with the lower teeth, bringing the gum tissue with them.

== Advantages ==
- Improves aesthetics of anterior teeth.
- Requires minimal removal of soft tissue.
- Does not compromise the periodontal structures.
- Can correct uneven gingival zeniths (the most apical portion of the free gingiva).
- Can lengthen clinical crown height (which is important in tooth wear cases).
- Reduces the amount of maxillary gingiva on display.
- Can allow for both sub- and supra-gingival restorations.
- Allows for additional tooth structure to withstand the mechanical needs during restorative procedures.

== Disadvantages ==
The morphological characteristics of the dentition and gingiva influence a patient's smile greatly. This should be used in order to predict how a patient's smile should be restored.

1. A bony defect which cannot be corrected. If it can be corrected, this surgery must be carried out prior to the gum lift.
2. If the gingiva is fragile.
3. If the location of the base of the pocket is apical to the mucogingival junction. This would cause problems with healing.
4. If the patient is not affected by the aesthetics.
5. Depending on the shape of the anterior teeth, "black triangles" may develop in the area where there is labial or interproximal soft tissue recession following the gum lift. This leads to an undesired outcome.
6. A gum lift is not available on the NHS and so would need to be obtained privately, where the charge is variable.

== Techniques ==
=== Gingivectomy by electrosurgery ===
Electrosurgery is defined as "the intentional passage of high frequency waveforms or currents through tissues of the body to achieve a controllable surgical effect" and has been used for over 50 years in dentistry.

The presence of a circuit is essential for the process in order for a current to flow; changing the mode of activation of this current enables electrosurgery to both cut and coagulate the oral soft tissues, resulting in minimal bleeding and a clear field of view for the clinician.

Radiofrequency alternating current is used to heat the gingival tissues. The rapid alternating polarity in electrosurgery (300 kHz to 4 mHz) causes oscillation of the ions within the gingival cells resulting in friction being generated, which in turn converts electrical energy to thermal energy. As the temperature is increased above 60 °C, the processes of protein coagulation and desiccation occur in which the water content of the cells is driven out. Desiccation coagulation is essential in order to achieve haemostasis and is continued until all the water is dissipated or until the temperature reaches 100 °C, whereby vaporisation of the cells occurs.

There are two types of electrosurgical units; monopolar and bipolar.

Monopolar units require a separate electrode which is usually in the form of a plate that the patient is lay on. The current passes through the patient's oral cavity through a wire as it completes the circuit from the active electrosurgical unit to the secondary return electrode, cutting the oral tissues as heat is produced.

Bipolar units do not require a patient return electrode as the active and return functions are performed by the cutting tip alone. Two electrodes are present on the cutting tip of the bipolar device and the current travels between these, consequently removing the need for a plate. Only the tissue contacted is included in the electrical circuit and a wider cut is achieved by this method.

=== Surgical gingivectomy ===
Local anaesthetic is used to keep the patient comfortable during the procedure. The technique is completed with a surgical scalpel and involves trimming and removing the tissue around the teeth. The remaining gums are reattached in and around the teeth by sutures (stitches), and the area is cleaned with saline and patients.

After the procedure is completed, a surgical dressing, or pack, is placed in and around the teeth and gums. This dressing is left in place for about a week.

=== Laser gingivectomy ===
Dental lasers, and in particular diode lasers, are being increasingly used, and gingivectomy is the most common procedure performed with dental lasers. All laser wavelengths can be used to precisely incise gingiva for restorative, cosmetic, and periodontal indications; however, diode lasers come with smaller set up and often better price. Rapid healing and reduced pain are commonly seen post-operatively and patients rarely need periodontal packing or sutures.

Laser types include:

- Nd:YAG (Neodymium: Yttrium Aluminium Garnet) laser
- CO_{2} laser
- Diode laser

=== Scalpel vs. laser ===
Surgery performed by scalpel has advantages of ease of use, precise incision with well-defined margins, the healing is fast, and there is no lateral tissue damage. While the disadvantages of surgery are the need to manage operative and post-operative pain by the provision of giving anaesthesia and analgesia, as well as bleeding that results in inadequate visibility.

Laser treatment seems to have good patient acceptance as patients report minimal pain.

Diode laser is absorbed by haemoglobin and melanin, and therefore allows for easy manipulation of soft-tissue during gingival recontouring, and results in improved epithelization and healing of the wound. During the use of laser, heat will be generated which will result in coagulation, drying and vaporization around the site which will prevent bleeding by sealing the blood vessels and also inhibiting the pain receptors at the incision site.

The clinical use of a laser for gingivectomy involves repeated lasing and wiping away tissue remnants with moist gauze and this results in a bloodless operating field allowing better visibility and greater ease for the operator. The laser also sterilizes the tissues and eliminates the need for a post-surgical dressing.

Better control of laser, less post-operative inflammation and pain and improved surgical site healing are benefits of laser surgery.

Soft tissue laser surgery has some disadvantages, including higher cost.
