= Gingivectomy =

Surgical removal of gum tissue

- MeSH: D005890

Gingivectomy is a dental procedure in which a dentist or oral surgeon cuts away part of the gums in the mouth (the gingiva).

It is the oldest surgical approach in periodontal therapy and is usually done for improvement of aesthetics or prognosis of teeth.

By removing the pocket wall, gingivectomy provides visibility and accessibility for complete calculus removal and thorough smoothing of the roots, creating a favourable environment for gingival healing and restoration of a physiologic gingival contour. The procedure may also be carried out so that access to sub-gingival caries or crown margins is allowed. A common aesthetic reason for gingivectomy is a gummy smile due to gingival overgrowth.

== Indications ==
=== Elimination of suprabony fibrous and firm pockets ===
Gingivectomy is the primary treatment method available in reducing the pocket depths of patients with periodontitis and suprabony pockets. In a retrospective comparison between different treatment approach to periodontitis management based on the initial and final gingival health, conventional gingivectomy was proven to be more successful in reducing pocket depths and inflammation compared to non-surgical treatments in pockets measured 3mm or more. Removal of suprabony deep pockets will allow better visibility and access for the removal of calculus. As a result, this provides a suitable environment for the healing of the gingiva and the physiological contour of the gingiva to be restored.

=== Elimination of gingival enlargement ===
In cases of gingival enlargement induced by drugs, surgical treatment through a gingivectomy proved to be effective with most patients showing no clinical sign of recurrence after one year. Even though it is the most frequent method of treatment, it is only indicated when overgrowth is severe.

Another cause of gingival enlargement would be a hereditary condition known as gingival fibromatosis. The extensive overgrowth of gingival tissue is usually treated with a gingivectomy, as it produces good aesthetic results. However, recurrence in these cases are unpredictable. This means that those affected face the possibility of undergoing repeated procedures.

=== Increase in clinical crown height ===
==== Sub-gingival margins ====
A gingivectomy can also be done to increase the clinical crown height of teeth. This is suitable in treatment planning for teeth with inadequate tissue for retention of prosthetic restorations as a result of subgingival carious lesions or coronal fractures. Surgical treatment resets the margin while maintaining the biological width and clinical attachment.

==== Gummy smiles ====
Up to 3mm of gingival display when smiling is described to be cosmetically acceptable. Gummy smiles are often used to describe smiles where there is more than 3mm of gingival tissue seen clinically and is usually deemed unaesthetic to the individual. Similar to subgingival crevices margins, gingivectomy to increase the crown height can be performed to provide better aesthetics and normal gingival architecture.

== Contraindications ==
- Need for bone surgery
- When bottom of the pocket is apical to the mucogingival junction
- Aesthetic considerations, particularly in anterior region of the maxilla

Dental/gingival morphologic characteristics and peri-oral variables influence the patient's smile frame. They are essential in achieving a predictable successful rehabilitation of the patient's smile.

In males and females, the mean vertical height of the maxillary central incisors averages 10.6mm and 9.8mm respectively. With the lip line at rest, the mean maxillary incisors display is 1.91mm for men and 3.40mm for women (nearly double the amount). More recent studies have been done to confirm the statistically significant sexual dimorphism relative to the height of visible maxillary incisor crown at rest. The data from a study also clearly indicates that higher smile lines are more common among female, and lower smile patterns among male patients. A high smile line displays the entire crown of the tooth and an abundant amount of gingiva. Thus, this procedure can be viewed subjectively by some people as some degree of gingival display may be aesthetically pleasing and is considered youthful, and vice versa.

Besides that, the harmony of the gingival outline between anterior and posterior segments may be affected. Some people are more prone to expose the maxillary teeth from the second premolar of one side to another side of the second premolar while smiling. Hence, there have been discussions in some cases whereby all teeth between the first molars are included in the procedure, especially in surgical crown lengthening, to achieve an aesthetically pleasing gingival architecture blending in harmoniously the gingival contours of the maxillary anterior and posterior teeth. Apart from that, "black triangles" are likely to develop in areas where there is labial or interproximal soft tissue recession. This leads to the desired outcome.

== Techniques and post-operative management/healing ==
Gingivectomy can be performed by various techniques.

=== Surgical gingivectomy ===
To reduce post-operative pain for the patient, the surgery should be as atraumatic as the surgeon can make it. If the procedure has been carried out carefully, the patient's post-operative pain is minimised. Pain may be experienced initially following the procedure, but this should subside within a few days and can be appropriately controlled with drugs to alleviate the pain. The patient should also be advised to avoid using the area where the surgery was performed when chewing during the initial healing stage. Adequate plaque control is important in ensuring long-term results from the procedure, and if post-operative infection control levels are maintained then the patient should be able to keep a healthy periodontium. However, the outcome of the procedure may be influenced by other general factors such as the systemic status of the patient. If patients do not maintain the appropriate oral hygiene levels and post-operative care, then it is inevitable that the disease will return. Patients may struggle with self-performed oral hygiene initially after the procedure, due to pain and discomfort, so regular visits for professional tooth cleaning are advised. Immediately after the surgery, patients are recommended to rinse with an appropriate anti-plaque agent. After the sutures are removed, the area should be irrigated and the teeth should be polished. If the area is ready for mechanical tooth brushing to begin again, gentle brushing is demonstrated to the patient using a toothbrush that has been softened in hot water. In the early stages after the procedure, the use of interdental brushes is strongly advised against due to the potential damage to interdental tissues in the operated area, toothpicks are recommended as an alternative. The patient is asked to visit every two weeks for monitoring of their plaque levels. The time between visits will gradually increase if the patients’ plaque control is up to standard.

=== Gingivectomy by electrosurgery ===
Electrosurgery is defined as the intentional passage of high-frequency waveforms or currents through the tissues of the body to achieve a controllable surgical effect. It has been used in dentistry for more than 60 years.

Electrosurgery may be used where a blood-free environment is required, providing that there is no bone coming into contact with the instrument and good oral hygiene is maintained. The technique is not widely used due to multiple factors including cost and lack of information available on the topic.

It is essential to have the presence of a circuit in an electrosurgical unit, allowing current to flow. By changing the mode of activation of this current, electrosurgery may be used for the cutting or coagulation of soft tissues. The basic types of electrosurgical techniques are coagulation, desiccation, fulguration and electrosection (cutting). The majority of clinical operations are done by electrosection.

There are two main types of electrosurgical units, monopolar and bipolar.

In monopolar units a separate electrode is needed, usually in the form of an indifferent plate behind the patient's back. The current begins in the electrosurgical unit and flows to the oral site through a wire and then to the secondary electrode. Heat is produced on contact with the oral tissues and cutting results. Bipolar devices have two electrodes on their cutting tip and the current travels from one to the other, which removes the need for an indifferent plate. Bipolar devices make a wider cut.

The results of studies which have looked at healing of electrosurgical wounds compared to scalpel wounds vary widely but it has been found that electrosurgerical equipment minimises bleeding and most patients experience very little post-operative pain after the procedure. There may be more damage to adjacent tissues, slower wound healing and more inflammatory response than the scalpel technique.

=== Laser gingivectomy ===
Laser types include:

- Nd:YAG (Neodymium: Yttrium Aluminium Garnet) laser
- CO_{2} laser
- Diode laser

It has been suggested that lasers can give a substantial reduction in bacteria such as Actinobacillus actinomycetemcomitans (Aa) which will reduce inflammation and facilitate the healing process. Laser treatment seems to also have good patient acceptance as patients report minimal pain. Nd:YAG lasers used for curettage of pocket epithelium cause little or no damage to the underlying tissues.

Periodontal health and reattachment of gingival tissues to previously infected root surfaces is the goal of periodontal therapy and this is typically achieved through conventional treatment by scaling, root surface instrumentation and ultrasonic instrumentation. Conventional treatment however does not completely remove plaque and calculus and a laser has been suggested as an effective tool for periodontal treatment because:

- It efficiently sterilizes the infected root surfaces and periodontal pocket microflora
- Curettes the adjacent pocket epithelium
- Removes the smear layer
- Enhances calculus elimination

It has been suggested that laser treatment results in minimal or no post-operative swelling, bleeding, scar tissue formation or pain.

Regarding wound healing animal studies have shown better response in rat skin after Nd:YAG laser application than following scalpel incisions but this is only valid when energy and frequency parameters were low and higher levels of energy lead to scar formation and delayed wound healing.

The clinical use of a laser for gingivectomy involves repeated lasing and wiping away tissue remnants with moist gauze and this results in a bloodless operating field allowing better visibility and greater ease for the operator. Apart from ablating and coagulating the laser also sterilizes the tissues and eliminates the need for a post-surgical dressing. One study found that in patients with drug induced gingival overgrowth recurrence was minimal or eliminated when comparing laser gingivectomy to scalpel gingivectomy.

== See also ==
- List of surgeries by type
