= Tooth whitening =

Process to lighten the colour of teeth

Tooth whitening or tooth bleaching is the process of lightening the colour of human teeth. Whitening is often desirable when teeth become yellowed over time for a number of reasons, and can be achieved by changing the intrinsic or extrinsic colour of the tooth enamel. The chemical degradation of the chromogens within or on the tooth is termed as bleaching.

Hydrogen peroxide (H_{2}O_{2}) is the active ingredient most commonly used in whitening products and is delivered as either hydrogen peroxide or carbamide peroxide. Hydrogen peroxide is analogous to carbamide peroxide as it is released when the stable complex is in contact with water. When it diffuses into the tooth, hydrogen peroxide acts as an oxidising agent that breaks down to produce unstable free radicals. In the spaces between the inorganic salts in tooth enamel, these unstable free radicals attach to organic pigment molecules resulting in small, less heavily pigmented components. Reflecting less light, these smaller molecules create a "whitening effect". Peroxyacids are an alternative to hydrogen peroxide and also contribute to the breakdown of pigment molecules. There are different products available on the market to remove stains. For whitening treatment to be successful, dental professionals (dental hygienist or dentist) should correctly diagnose the type, intensity and location of the tooth discolouration. Time exposure and the concentration of the bleaching compound determines the tooth whitening endpoint.

== Natural shade ==
The perception of tooth colour is multi-factorial. Reflection and absorption of light by the tooth can be influenced by a number of factors, including specular transmission of light through the tooth, specular reflection at the surface, diffuse light reflection at the surface, absorption and scattering of light within the dental tissues, enamel mineral content, enamel thickness, dentine colour, the human observer, the fatigue of the eye, the type of incident light, and the presence of extrinsic and intrinsic stains. Additionally, the perceived brightness of the tooth can change depending on the brightness and colour of the background.

The combination of intrinsic colour and the presence of extrinsic stains on the tooth surface influence the colour and thus the overall appearance of teeth. The scattering of light and absorption within enamel and dentine determine the intrinsic colour of teeth and because the enamel is relatively translucent, the dentinal properties can play a major role in determining the overall tooth colour. On the other hand, extrinsic stain and colour is the result of coloured regions that have formed within the acquired pellicle on the enamel surface and can be influenced by lifestyle behaviours or habits. For example, dietary intake of tannin-rich foods, poor tooth brushing technique, tobacco products, and exposure to iron salts and chlorhexidine can darken the colour of a tooth.

With increasing age, teeth tend to grow darker in shade. This can be attributed to secondary dentin formation and thinning of enamel due to tooth wear which contributes to a significant decrease in lightness and increase in yellowness. Tooth shade is not influenced by gender or race.

== Staining and discolouration ==
Tooth discolouration and staining is primarily due to two sources of stain: intrinsic and extrinsic (see Figure 2). In essence, tooth whitening primarily targets those intrinsic stains in which cannot be removed through mechanics such as a debridement (clean) or prophylaxis, in the dental office. Below explains in-depth the differences between the two sources of which contribute to such discolouration of the tooth's surface.

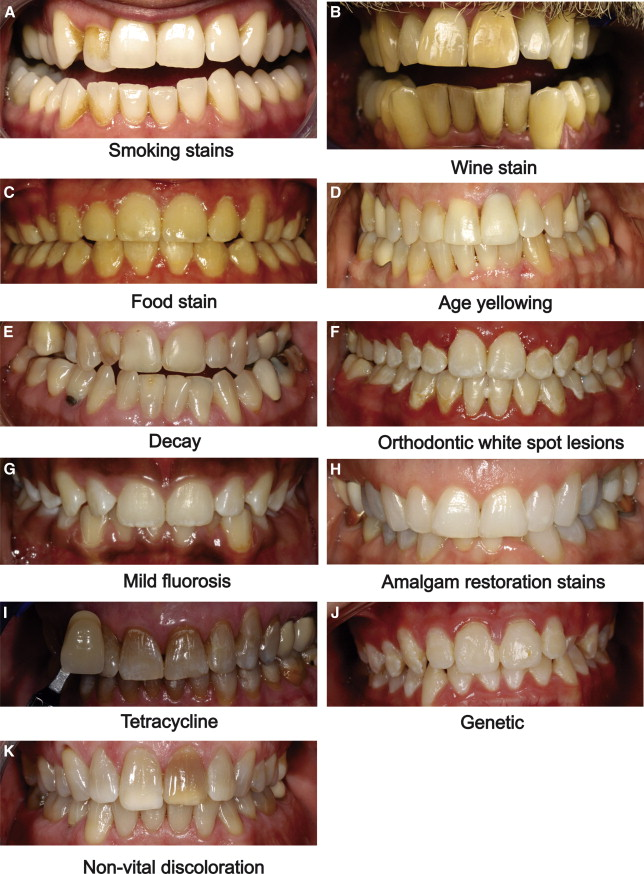
Figure 2. Examples of tooth staining. Extrinsic staining examples: A. Smoking; B. Wine stain; and C. Food stain. Intrinsic staining examples: D. Age yellowing; E. Decay; F. Orthodontic white spot lesion; G. Mild fluorosis; H. Amalgam restoration; I. Tetracycline stain; J. Genetic (amelogenesis imperfecta); K. and non-vital colouring.

=== Extrinsic staining ===
Extrinsic staining, is largely due to environmental factors including smoking, pigments in beverages and foods, antibiotics, and metals such as iron or copper. Coloured compounds from these sources are adsorbed into acquired dental pellicle or directly onto the surface of the tooth causing a stain to appear.

- Dental plaque: Dental plaque is a clear biofilm of bacteria that naturally forms in the mouth, particularly along the gumline, and it occurs due to the normal development and defences of the immune system. Although usually virtually invisible on the tooth surface, plaque may become stained by chromogenic bacteria such as Actinomyces species. Prolonged dental plaque accumulation on the tooth surface can lead to enamel demineralisation and formation of white spot lesions which appear as an opaque milk-coloured lesion. The acidic by-products of fermentable carbohydrates derived from high-sugar foods contribute to greater proportions of bacteria, such as Streptococcus mutans and Lactobacillus in dental plaque. Higher consumption of fermentable carbohydrates will promote demineralisation and increase the risk of developing white spot lesions.
- Calculus: neglected plaque will eventually calcify, and lead to the formation of a hard deposit on the teeth, especially around the gumline. The organic matrix of dental plaque and calcified tissues undergo a series of chemical and morphological changes that lead to calcification of the dental plaque and therefore leading to the formation of calculus. The color of calculus varies, and may be grey, yellow, black, or brown. The colour of calculus depends on how long it has been present in the oral cavity for; it typically starts off yellow and over time the calculus will begin to stain a darker colour and become more tenacious and difficult to remove.
- Tobacco: tar in the smoke from tobacco products (and also smokeless tobacco products) tends to form a yellow-brown-black stain around the necks of the teeth above the gumline. The nicotine and tar in tobacco, combined with oxygen, turns yellow and over time will absorb into the pores of enamel and stain the teeth yellow. The dark brown to black stains along the gum line of the teeth are the result of the porous nature of calculus immediately picking up the stains from nicotine and tar.
- Betel chewing. Betel chewing produces blood-red saliva that stains the teeth red-brown to nearly black. The extract gel of betel leaf contain tannin, a chromogenic agent that causes discolouration of the tooth enamel.
- Tannin is also present in coffee, tea, and red wine and produces a chromogenic agent that can discolor teeth. Large consumptions of tannin-containing beverages stain the dental enamel brown due to the chromogenic nature.
- Certain foods, including curries and tomato-based sauces, can cause teeth staining.
- Certain topical medications: Chlorhexidine (antiseptic mouthwash) binds to tannins, meaning that prolonged use in persons who consume coffee, tea or red wine is associated with extrinsic staining (i.e. removable staining) of teeth. Chlorhexidine mouthwash has a natural liking for sulphate and acidic groups commonly found in areas where plaque accumulates such as along the gumline, on the dorsum of the tongue and cavities. Chlorhexidine is retained in these areas and stain yellow-brown. The stains are not permanent and can be removed with proper brushing.
- Metallic compounds. Exposure to such metallic compounds may be in the form of medication or occupational exposure. Examples include iron (black stain), iodine (black), copper (green), nickel (green), and cadmium (yellow-brown). Sources of exposure to metal include placing metal into the oral cavity, metal-containing dust inhalation, or oral administration of drugs. Metals can enter the bony structure of the tooth, causing permanent discolouration, or can bind to the pellicle causing surface stain.

==== Removal of extrinsic staining ====
Extrinsic staining may be removed through various treatment methods:

- Prophylaxis: dental prophylaxis includes the removal of extrinsic staining using a slow-speed rotary handpiece and a rubber cup with abrasive paste, mostly containing fluoride. The abrasive nature of the prophy paste, as it is known, acts to remove extrinsic staining using the action of the slow-speed handpiece and the paste against the tooth. Adversely, the action of the rubber cup together with the abrasive nature of the paste, removes around one micron of enamel from the tooth surface every time a prophylaxis is performed. This method of stain removal may only take place in the dental office.
- Micro-abrasion: allows a dental professional to make use of an instrument which emits a powder, water and compressed air to remove biofilm, and extrinsic staining. This stain removal method can only be undertaken in a dental office, not at home.
- Toothpaste: there are many available on the market that implement both peroxide as well as abrasive particles, such as silica gel, to help remove extrinsic stains, while the peroxide acts on intrinsic staining. This method of stain removal may take place at home as well as in a dental office.

=== Intrinsic staining ===
Intrinsic staining primarily occurs during the tooth development either before birth or at early childhood. Intrinsic stains are those that cannot be removed through mechanical measures such as debridement or a prophylactic stain removal. As the age of the person increases, the teeth can also appear yellower over time. Below are examples of intrinsic sources of stains:

- Tooth wear and aging: Tooth wear is a progressive loss of enamel and dentine due to tooth erosion, abrasion and attrition. As enamel wears down, dentine becomes more apparent and chromogenic agents are penetrated in the tooth more easily. The natural production of secondary dentine also gradually darkens teeth with age.
- Dental cavities (tooth decay): The evidence regarding carious tooth discolouration is inconclusive, however the most reliable evidence suggests that carious lesion allows for exogenous agents to enter dentine and hence increased absorption of chromogenic agents causing discolouration to the tooth.
- Restorative materials: The materials used during root canal treatments, such as eugenol and phenolic compounds, contain pigment that stain dentine. Restorations using amalgam also penetrate dentine tubules with tin over time therefore causing dark stains to the tooth.
- Dental trauma which may cause staining either as a result of pulp necrosis or internal resorption. Alternatively the tooth may become darker without pulp necrosis.
- Enamel hypoplasia: Enamel hypoplasia causes enamel to be thin and weak. It produces a yellow-brown discolouration and can also cause the enamel's smooth surface to be rough and pitted which causes the tooth to be susceptible to extrinsic staining, tooth sensitivity, malocclusion, and dental cavities. The evidence regarding enamel hypoplasia is inconclusive, however the most likely cause is infection or trauma caused to the primary dentition. Disturbances to the developing tooth germ during neonatal and early childhood stages such as maternal vitamin D deficiency, infection, and medication intake can cause enamel hypoplasia.
- Pulpal hyperemia: Pulpal hyperemia refers to inflammation of a traumatised tooth which can be caused by a stimuli such as trauma, thermal shock, or dental cavities. Pulpal hyperemia is reversible and produces a red hue seen initially after trauma which has the ability to disappear if the tooth becomes revascularized.
- Fluorosis: Dental fluorosis causes enamel to become opaque, chalky white, and porous. The enamel can break down and cause the exposed subsurface enamel to become mottled and produce extrinsic dark brown-black stains. Dental fluorosis occurs due to excessive ingestion of fluoride or overexposure to fluoride during the development of enamel which usually occurs between the ages of one and four. Fluoridated drinking water, fluoride supplements, topical fluoride (fluoride toothpastes), and formula prescribed for children can increase the risk of dental fluorosis. Fluoride is considered an important factor in the management and prevention of dental cavities, the safe level for daily fluoride intake is 0.05 to 0.07 mg/kg/day.
- Dentinogenesis imperfecta: Dentinogenesis imperfecta is a hereditary dentine defect, associated with osteogenesis imperfecta, which causes the tooth to become discoloured usually blue or brown in colour and translucent giving teeth an opalescent sheen. The condition is autosomal dominant which means that the condition runs in the family.
- Amelogenesis imperfecta: The appearance of amelogenesis imperfecta depends on the type of amelogenesis, there are 14 different subtypes and can vary from the appearance of hypoplasia to hypomineralisation which can produce different appearances of enamel from white mottling to yellow brown appearances.
- Tetracycline and minocycline. Tetracycline is a broad-spectrum antibiotic, and its derivative minocycline is common in the treatment of acne. The drug is able to chelate calcium ions and is incorporated into teeth, cartilage, and bone. Ingestion during the years of tooth development causes yellow-green discoloration of dentine visible through the enamel which is fluorescent under ultraviolet light. Later, the tetracycline is oxidized and the staining becomes more brown and no longer fluoresces under UV light.
- Porphyria: A rare metabolic disorder in which the body fails to adequately metabolise porphyrins, which leads to accumulation or excretion of porphyrins into teeth. The excretion of porphyrins produces purple-red pigments in teeth.
- Hemolytic disease of the newborn: This disease occurs when a newborn's red blood cells are being attacked by antibodies from the mother caused by an incompatibility between the mother and baby's blood. This condition can produce green staining of teeth due to jaundice, which is an inability to excrete bilirubin properly.
- Root resorption: Root resorption is clinically asymptomatic; however, it can produce a pink appearance at the amelocemental junction.
- Alkaptonuria: Metabolic disorder which promotes the accumulation of homogentisic acid in the body and may cause brown colour pigmentation in the teeth, gums, and buccal mucosa.

== Methods ==
Prior to proceeding to tooth whitening alternatives, it is advised that the patient comes into the dental office to have a comprehensive oral examination that consists of a full medical, dental, and social history. This will allow the clinician to see if there is any treatment that needs to be done such as restorations to remove cavities, and to assess whether or not the patient will be a good candidate to have the whitening done. The clinician would then debride (clean) the tooth surface with an ultrasonic scaler, hand instruments, and potentially a prophy paste to remove extrinsic stains as mentioned above. This will allow a clean surface for maximum benefits of whichever tooth whitening method the patient chooses. Below will discuss the various types of tooth whitening methods including both internal application of bleaching and external application through the use of bleaching agents.

=== In-office ===
Figure 3. Shade guides

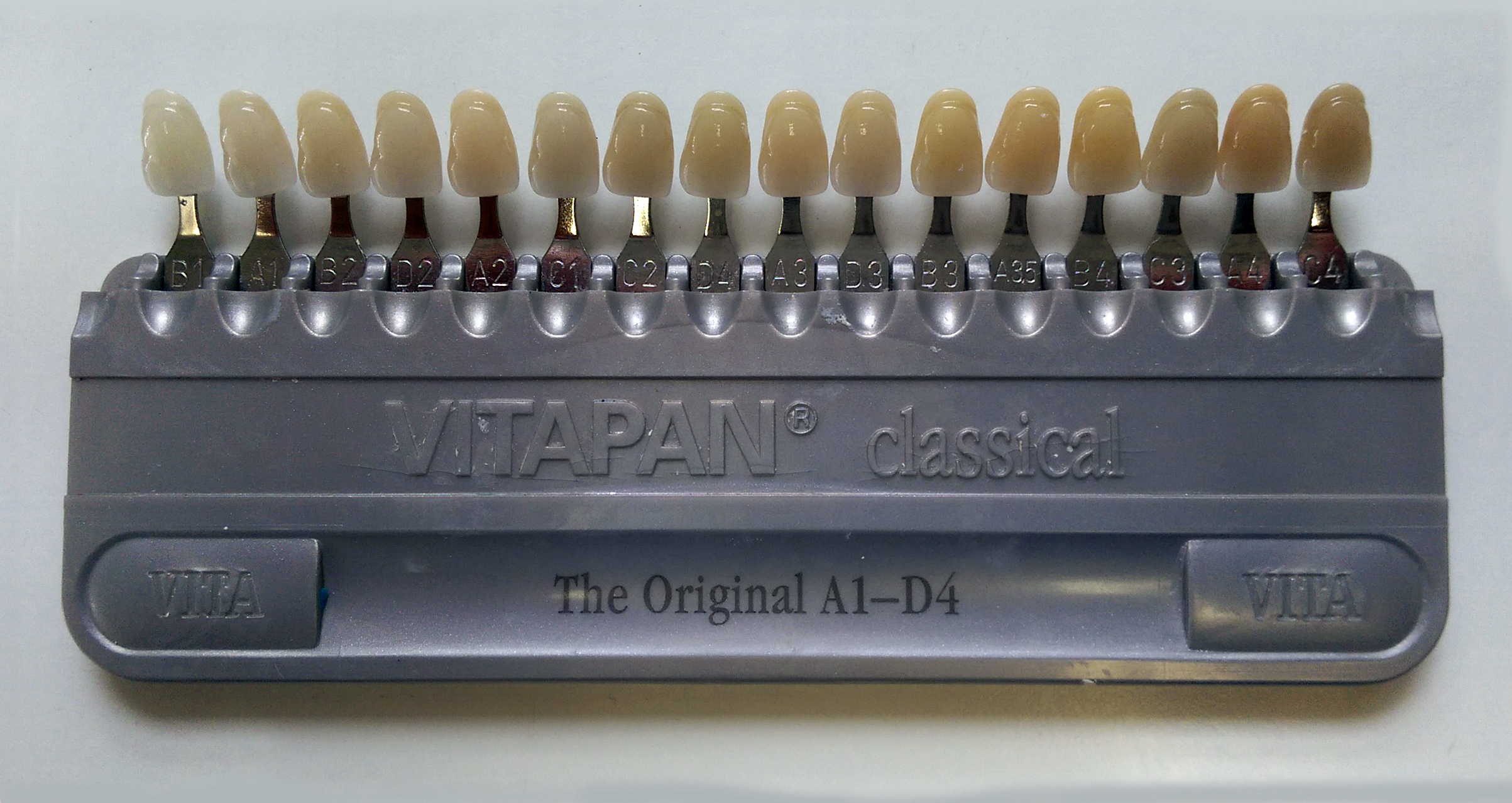
VITA classical A1-D4 shade guide arranged according to value

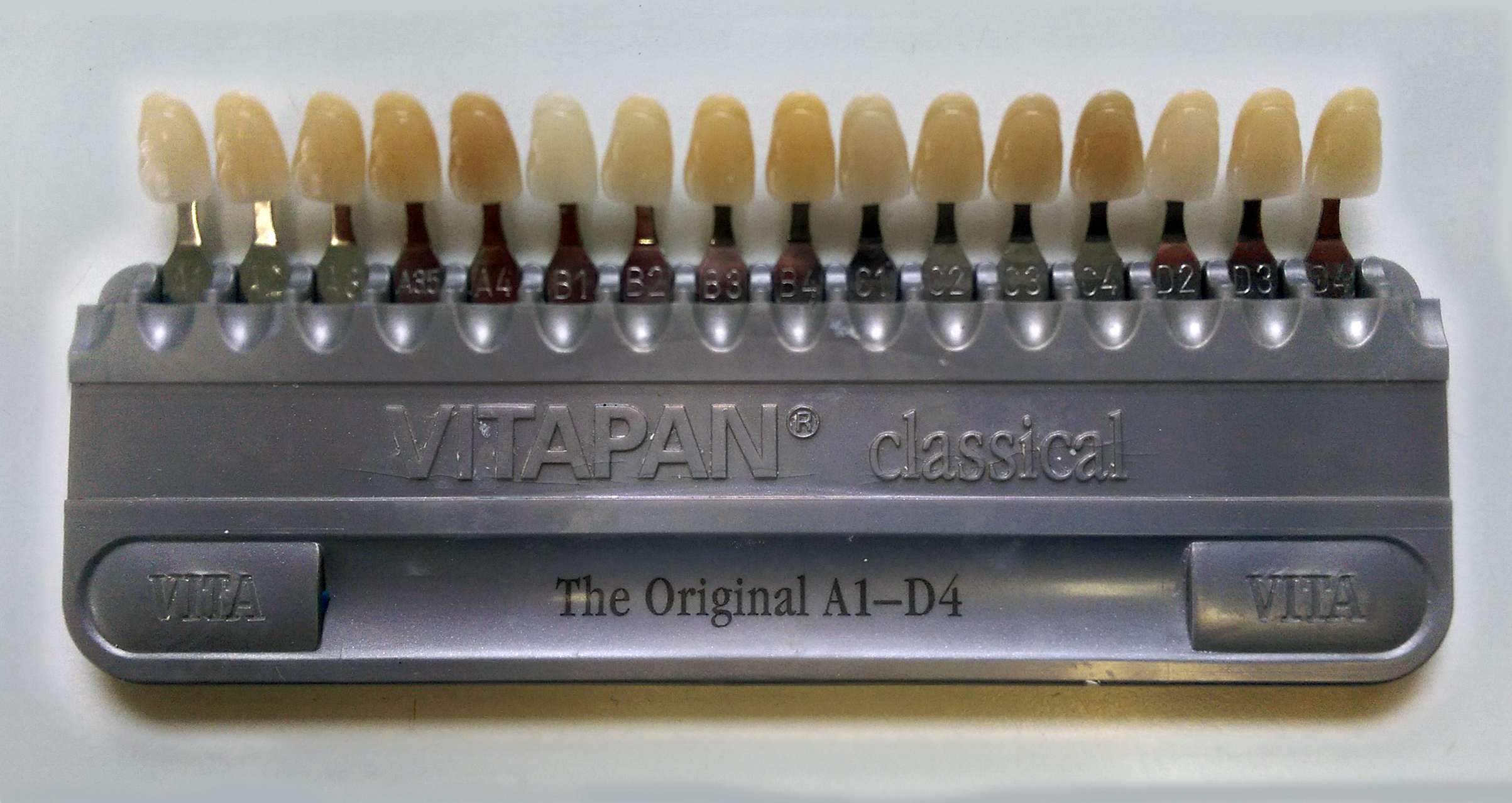
VITA classical A1-D4 shade guide arranged according to chroma; A: red-brown, B: red-yellow, C: grey, D: red-grey

Before the treatment, the clinician should examine the patient: taking a health and dental history (including allergies and sensitivities), observe hard and soft tissues, placement and conditions of restorations, and sometimes x-rays to determine the nature and depth of possible irregularities. If this is not completed prior to the whitening agents being applied to the tooth surface, excessive sensitivity and other complications may occur.

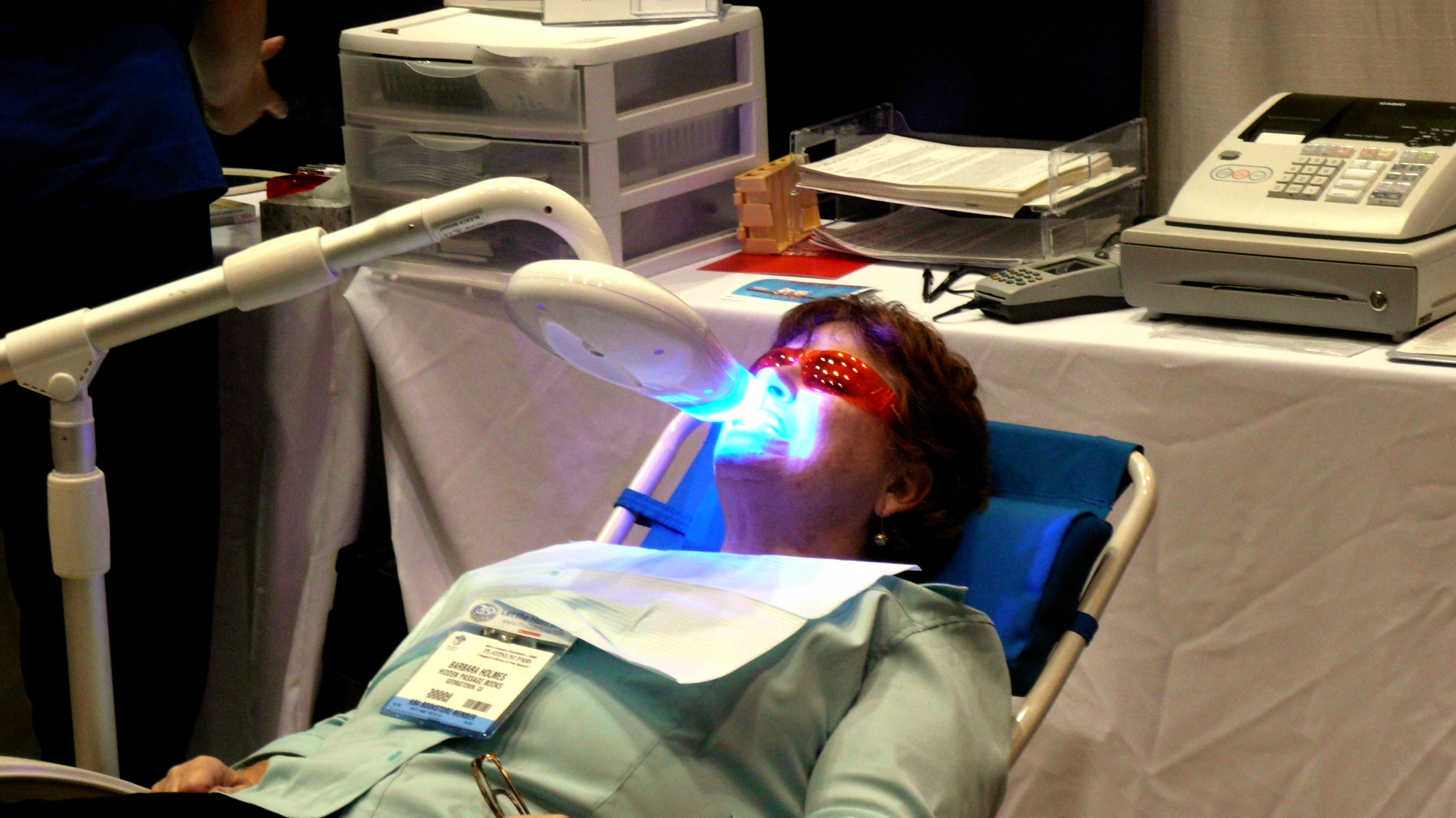
In office tooth whitening with laser light activation

The whitening shade guides are used to measure tooth colour. These shades determine the effectiveness of the whitening procedure, which may vary from two to seven shades. These shades may be reached after a single in office appointment, or may take longer, depending on the individual. The effects of bleaching can last for several months, but may vary depending on the lifestyle of the patient. Consuming tooth staining foods or drinks that have a strong colour may compromise effectiveness of the treatment. These include food and drinks containing tannins such as; coffee, tea, red wines, and curry.

In-office bleaching procedures generally use a light-cured protective layer that is carefully painted on the gums and papilla (the tips of the gums between the teeth) to reduce the risk of chemical burns to the soft tissues. The bleaching agent is either carbamide peroxide, which breaks down in the mouth to form hydrogen peroxide, or hydrogen peroxide itself. The bleaching gel typically contains between 10% and 44% carbamide peroxide, which is roughly equivalent to a 3% to 16% hydrogen peroxide concentration. In the European Union, the legal percentage of hydrogen peroxide allowed in retail tooth whitening products is 0.1%. Under the supervision of a dental professional, up to 6% concentrations are allowed. Bleaching agents are only allowed to be given by dental practitioners, dental therapists, and dental hygienists.

Bleaching is least effective when the original tooth color is grayish and may require custom bleaching trays. Bleaching is most effective with yellow discolored teeth. If heavy staining or tetracycline damage is present on a patient's teeth, and whitening is ineffective (tetracycline staining may require prolonged bleaching, as it takes longer for the bleach to reach the dentine layer), there are other methods of masking the stain. Bonding, which also masks tooth stains, is when a thin coating of composite material is applied to the front of a person's teeth and then cured with a blue light. A veneer can also mask tooth discoloration.

In-chair whitening is faster and more effective in comparison to the take-home bleaching options. Some clinicians also make custom bleaching trays, which can take up to a week to create. After the whitening treatment is completed, the patient is able to use these trays for maintenance of their bleaching with at-home kits or for use with desensitising products.

==== Light-accelerated bleaching ====
Power or light-accelerated bleaching uses light energy which is intended to accelerate the process of bleaching in a dental office. Different types of energy can be used in this procedure, with the most common being halogen, LED, or plasma arc. The productive whitening effect and the risk of tooth sensitivity both depend greatly on the type of light, its delivered intensity, its temperature, the duration of use, and the time of use. When used properly, light can greatly increase the whitening effect with no increase in sensitivity. When used improperly, in may increase the risk of tooth sensitivity and may not be any more effective than bleaching without light when high concentrations of hydrogen peroxide are used. A 2015 study showed that the use of a light activator does not improve bleaching, has no measurable effect, and rather is likely to increase the temperature of the associated tissues, resulting in damage.

The ideal source of energy should be high energy to excite the peroxide molecules without overheating the pulp of the tooth. Lights are typically within the blue light spectrum as this has been found to contain the most effective wavelengths for initiating the hydrogen peroxide reaction. A power bleaching treatment typically involves isolation of soft tissue with a resin-based, light-curable barrier, application of a professional dental-grade hydrogen peroxide whitening gel (25–38% hydrogen peroxide), and exposure to the light source for 6–15 minutes. Recent technical advances have minimized heat and UV emissions, allowing for a shorter patient preparation procedure.

For any whitening treatments, it is recommended that a comprehensive examination of the patient is done including the use of radiographs to aid in the diagnosis of the current condition of the mouth, including any allergies that may be present. The patient will need to have a healthy mouth and free of periodontal disease or cavities and to have had a debridement/clean done to remove any tartar or plaque build up.

It is recommended to avoid smoking, drinking red wine, eating or drinking any deeply coloured foods after this as the teeth may stain considerably straight after treatment.

==== Internal bleaching ====
Internal bleaching is a process which occurs after a tooth has been endodontically treated. This means that the tooth will have had the nerve of the tooth extirpated or removed through a root canal treatment at the dentist or by a specialist endodontist. Internal bleaching is often sought after in teeth which have been endodontically treated as tooth discolouration becomes a problem due to the lack of nerve supply to that tooth. It is common to have this internal bleaching done on an anterior tooth (a front tooth that you can see when smiling and talking). A way around this is by sealing off the bleaching agent inside the tooth itself and replacing it every few weeks until the desired shade has been achieved. The amount of time between appointments varies from patient to patient and with operator preference until the desired shade has been achieved. Even though this is a great option, the disadvantage of this treatment is a risk of internal root resorption of the tooth that is being internally bleached. This may not occur in every patient or every tooth, and its occurrence is difficult to determine prior to completing the treatment.

=== At home ===
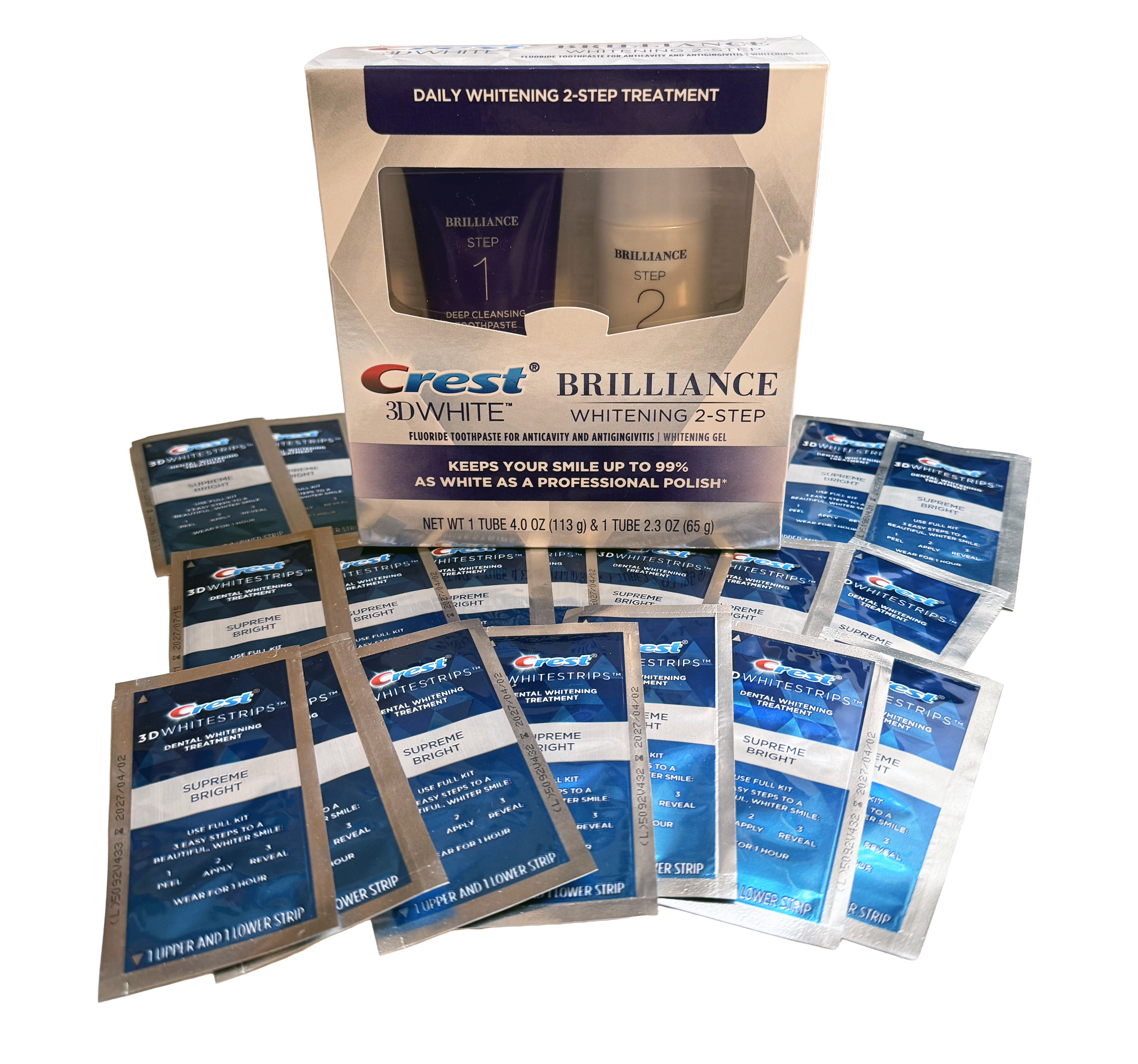
Assortment of typical OTC whitening products

At home tooth whitening products are available from dentists or 'over the counter' (OTC). At home whitening methods include over-the-counter strips and gels, whitening rinses, whitening toothpastes, and tray-based tooth whiteners. OTC products can be used for milder cases of tooth staining. Home-based bleaching (following manufacturer's instructions) results in less tooth sensitivity than in-office bleaching.

==== Strips and gels ====
The plastic whitening strips contain a thin layer of peroxide gel and are shaped to fit the buccal/labial surfaces of teeth. Many different types of whitening strips are available on the market, after being introduced in the late 1980s. Specific whitening strip products have their own set of instructions however the strips are typically applied twice daily for 30 minutes for 14 days. In several days, tooth colour can lighten by 1 or 2 shades. The tooth whitening endpoint does depend on the frequency of use and ingredients of the product.

Whitening gels are applied onto the tooth surface with a small brush. The gels contain peroxide and are recommended to be applied twice a day for 14 days. The tooth whitening endpoint like that of the whitening strips.

==== Rinses ====
Whitening rinses work by reaction of the oxygen sources such as hydrogen peroxide within the rinse and the chromogens on or within the tooth. It is recommended to use twice a day, rinsing for one minute. To see an improvement in shade colour, it can take up to three months.

==== Toothpastes ====
Whitening toothpastes differ from regular toothpastes in that they contain higher amounts of abrasives and detergents to be more effective at removing tougher stains. Some whitening toothpastes contain low concentrations of carbamide peroxide or hydrogen peroxide which help lighten tooth colour however they do not contain bleach (sodium hypochlorite). With continuity of use over time, tooth colour can lighten by one or two shades.

==== Tray-based ====
Tray-based tooth whitening is achieved by wearing a fitted tray containing carbamide peroxide bleaching gel overnight or for two to four hours a day. If manufacturer's instructions are followed, tooth whitening can occur within three days and lighten teeth by one or two shades. This type of tooth whitening is available over-the-counter and professionally from an oral health professional.

==== Baking soda ====
Baking soda is a safe, low abrasive, and effective stain removal and tooth whitening toothpaste. Tooth whitening toothpaste that have excessive abrasivity are harmful to dental tissue, therefore baking soda is a desirable alternative. To date, clinical studies on baking soda report that there have been no reported adverse effects. It also contains acid-buffering components that makes baking soda biologically antibacterial at high concentrations and capable of preventing growth of Streptococcus mutans. Baking soda might be useful for cavities-prone patients, as well as those who wish to have whiter teeth.

== Indications ==
Tooth whitening may be undertaken for a variety of reasons, but whitening may also be recommended to some individuals by dental professionals.

- Intrinsic tooth staining
- Aesthetics
- Dental fluorosis
- Endodontic treatment (internal bleaching)
- Tetracycline staining

== Contraindications ==
Some groups are advised to carry out tooth whitening with caution as they may be at higher risk of adverse effects.

- Patients with unrealistic expectations
- Allergy to peroxide
- Pre-existing sensitive teeth
- Cracks or exposed dentine
- Enamel development defects
- Acid erosion
- Receding gums (gingival recession) and yellow roots
- Sensitive gums
- Defective dental restorations
- Tooth decay. White-spot decalcification may be highlighted and become more noticeable directly following a whitening process, but with further applications the other parts of the teeth usually become more white and the spots less noticeable.
- Active periapical pathology
- Untreated periodontal disease
- Pregnant or lactating women
- Children under the age of 16. This is because the pulp chamber, or nerve of the tooth, is enlarged until this age. Tooth whitening under this condition could irritate the pulp or cause it to become sensitive. Younger people are also more susceptible to abusing bleaching.
- Persons with visible white fillings or crowns. Tooth whitening does not change the color of fillings and other restorative materials. It does not affect porcelain, other ceramics, or dental gold. However, it can slightly affect restorations made with composite materials, cements and dental amalgams. Tooth whitening will not restore color of fillings, porcelain, and other ceramics when they become stained by foods, drinks, and smoking, as these products are only effective on natural tooth structure. As such, a shade mismatch may be created as the natural tooth surfaces increase in whiteness and the restorations stay the same shade. Whitening agents do not work where bonding has been used and neither is it effective on tooth-colored filling materials. Other options to deal with such cases are the porcelain veneers or dental bonding.
- Individuals with poor oral hygiene

== Risks ==
Some of the common side effects involved in teeth whitening are increased sensitivity of the teeth, gum irritation, and extrinsic teeth discolouration.

=== Hypersensitivity ===
The use of bleach with extremely low pH levels in the tooth whitening procedure may lead to hypersensitive teeth, as it causes the dentinal tubules to open. Exposure to cold, hot, or sweet stimuli may further exacerbate the intensity of the hypersensitive response. Amongst those who receive in-office whitening treatment, between 67 and 78% of the individuals experience sensitivity after the procedure where hydrogen peroxide and heat is utilized. Although it varies from person to person, sensitivity after whitening treatment can last up to 4–39 days.

Potassium nitrate and sodium fluoride in toothpastes are used to ease discomfort following bleaching, however, there is no evidence to suggest that this is a permanent method to eradicate the issue of hypersensitivity.

=== Irritation of mucous membranes ===
Hydrogen peroxide is an irritant and cytotoxic. Hydrogen peroxide with concentrations of 10% or higher can cause tissue damage, be corrosive to mucous membranes and cause burning sensation to the skin. Chemical burns can commonly occur whilst bleaching, irritation and discolouration of the mucous membranes may occur if a high concentration of oxidising agent comes in to contact with unprotected tissue. Poorly fitting bleaching trays are amongst the most common reasons for chemical burns. The temporary burning induced by whitening treatments can be reduced by using custom-made plastic trays or nightguards provided by the dental professional. This prevents the leakage of solution onto the surrounding mucosa.

=== Uneven results ===
Uneven results are quite common after bleaching. Consuming less foods and drinks that cause surface staining of teeth can contribute to attaining a good result from tooth whitening.

=== Return to original pre-treatment shade ===
Nearly half the initial change in colour provided by an intensive in-office treatment (i.e., one hour treatment in a dentist's chair) may be lost in seven days. Rebound is experienced when a large proportion of the tooth whitening has come from tooth dehydration (also a significant factor in causing sensitivity). As the tooth rehydrates, tooth colour "rebounds", back toward where it started.

=== Over-bleaching ===
Over-bleaching, more often known as the "bleached effect", occurs among treatments that promise a large change over a short period of time e.g., hours. Over-bleaching can emit a translucent and brittle appearance.

=== Damage to enamel ===
Teeth enamel can have an adverse negative effect by whitening treatment. Evidence from studies show that carbamide peroxide present in whitening gels can damage the enamel surface. Although this effect is not as damaging as phosphoric acid etch, the increased irregularity of the teeth surface makes the teeth more susceptible to extrinsic staining, thus having an increased detrimental effect on the aesthetics. The increased porosity and changes in surface roughness may have an impact on the formation of supra- and subgingival plaque, thus increasing the adhesion of bacterial species such as Streptococcus mutans and Streptococcus sobrinus, significant contributors to dental cavities. Dental restorations are susceptible to unacceptable colour change even when using the home-based systems.

=== Weakened dentine ===
Intracoronal bleaching is a tooth whitening method that uses 30% more hydrogen peroxide. Such tooth whitening methods can weaken the mechanical properties of dentine and could potentially lead to severe tooth sensitivity.

=== Effects on existing restorations ===
Dental restorations are susceptible to unacceptable colour change even when using the home-based systems.

Ceramic crowns – aggressive bleaching can chemically react with ceramic crowns and reduce their stability.

Dental amalgam – exposure to carbamide peroxide solutions increase mercury release for one to two days. The release of amalgam components is said to be due to active oxidation. This increase in amalgam mercury release is proportional to the concentration of carbamide peroxide.

Resin composite – bond strength between enamel and resin based fillings become weakened. Many studies have found that 10–16% carbamide peroxide tooth bleaching gels (containing approximately 3.6–5.76% hydrogen peroxide) leads to an increase in the surface roughness and porosity of composite resins. However, the saliva may exert a protective effect. In addition, changes in the reflectance of the composite have been analysed following whitening with high concentration (30–35%) hydrogen peroxide. This suggests that tooth whitening negatively impacts composite resin restorations.

Glass ionomer and other cements – studies suggest that solubility of these materials may increase.

=== Bleachorexia ===
Bleachorexia is the term that is used to describe an individual that develops an unhealthy obsession with teeth whitening. This condition is similar to body dysmorphic disorder. The characteristics of bleachorexia are the continuous use of whitening products even though the teeth cannot possibly become whiter, despite the provision of repeated treatment. A person with bleachorexia will continually seek out for different whitening products, hence, it is recommended that a target shade is agreed upon before starting the treatment procedure to help with this problem.

=== Home teeth whitening risks ===
The use of personalised home whitening trays is a patient administered therapy that is prescribed and dispensed by a dentist. Patients need to actively participate in their treatment and follow the guidelines given by the dentist accurately. Erratic or inaccurate use of the bleaching trays could cause harm to the patient such as blistering or sensitivity of the teeth and the surrounding soft tissue. Inconsistent use of the bleaching trays can lead to the slowing and irregularity of the whitening process. Some patients with a substantial gag reflex may not be able to tolerate the trays and would need to consider other methods of teeth whitening.

=== Specific ingredient-based side effects ===
==== Hydrogen peroxide ====
Hydrogen peroxide-based bleaching agents are always associated with Reactive Oxygen Species (ROS). The free radicals diffuse through the enamel and dentin and break down the color molecules, resulting in the perception of a whiter tooth color. The downside is that these radicals have certain local harmful effects, such as enamel erosion, changes in the microhardness of the teeth, gum irritation, post-bleaching hypersensitivity, and burning sensations. The following side effects are also known:

- Even during treatment, there is often very painful sensitivity to the bleaching agent. Freshly treated teeth can be sensitive to sweets, acids, and temperature, which can be quite painful. However, these symptoms are usually temporary and subside within a few days after treatment.
- The long-term effects of higher concentration bleaching agents (>6% H_{2}O_{2} or equivalent) on the pulp, dentin, enamel, and oral soft tissues are not yet clarified. These bleaching agents are potentially harmful and should be used with caution only in dental practice.
- Bleaching can deplete minerals from the teeth, leading to demineralization and the temporary breakdown of the protein pellicle (the protective layer of the tooth). This can result in more or less pronounced white spots, which usually normalize within days after treatment. Remineralization can be supported by special gels.
- Bleaching can weaken the tooth structure. Internal bleaching can lead to tooth brittleness and root resorption.

==== Peroxycarboxylic acids ====
Bleaching agents based on peroxycarboxylic acids (PAP) can be chosen as an effective vehicle for tooth whitening. PAP has proven to be almost harmless to enamel with a safe and reliable bleaching effect. In the clinical application of PAP for tooth whitening, oxidation reactions also occur, and color molecules are bleached through chemical-physical processes. However, the reaction occurs without the formation of free radicals. This is the major and decisive difference, as free radicals are the main cause of tooth sensitivity and gum irritation in tooth whitening with hydrogen peroxide-based bleaching agents.

=== Other risks ===
Evidence suggests that hydrogen peroxide might act as a tumour promoter. Although cervical root resorption is more evidently observed in thermocatalytic bleaching methods, intracoronal internal bleaching may also lead to tooth root resorption. Moreover, severe damage to intracoronal dentine and tooth crown fracture can occur due to this bleaching method.

However, the International Agency of Research on Cancer (IARC) has concluded that there is insufficient evidence to prove that hydrogen peroxide is a carcinogen to humans. Recently, the genotoxic potential of hydrogen peroxide was evaluated. The results indicated that the oral health products that contain or release hydrogen peroxide up to 3.6% will not increase the cancerous risk of an individual, hence, it is safe to use in moderation.

== Maintenance ==
Despite achieving the results of treatment, stains can return within an initial couple of months of treatment. Various methods may be employed to prolong the treatment results, such as:

- Brush or flush out mouth with water after eating and drinking
- Floss to remove plaque and biofilms between the teeth
- Take special care during the first 2 days – the first 24–48 hours after the whitening procedure is seen as the most crucial period in which you must protect for your teeth the most. Hence, it is vital that non-staining drinks or foods are eaten during this time as enamel is prone to adhere to stains.
- Drink fluids that may cause staining through a straw
- Depending on the method used to whiten the teeth, re-treatment every six months or after a year may be required. If an individual is a smoker or they consume beverages with the capacity to stain, regular re-treatments would be required.

== History ==
Teeth whitening remedies have been present since ancient times. Despite seeming absurd, some methods were somewhat effective in their results.

Ancient Roman dentists believed in using urine with goat milk to make their teeth look whiter. Pearly white teeth symbolized beauty and marked wealth. In the Auyrveda medicine system, oil pulling was used as an oral therapy. For this process today, swish coconut or olive oil in your mouth for up to 20 minutes each day. In the late 17th century, many people reached out to barbers, who used a file to file down the teeth before applying an acid that would, in fact, whiten the teeth. Although the procedure was successful, the teeth would become completely eroded and more prone to becoming decayed. Guy de Chauliac suggested the following to whiten the teeth: "Clean the teeth gently with a mixture of honey and burnt salt to which some vinegar has been added." In 1877, oxalic acid was proposed for whitening, followed by calcium hypochlorite.

In the late 1920s, mouthwash containing pyrozone (ether peroxide) was found to reduce cavities while providing a whiter appearance to the teeth. By 1940s and 1950s, ether and hydrogen peroxide gels were used to whiten vital teeth, whereas non-vital teeth were whitened using pyrozone and sodium perborate.

In the late 1960s, Dr William Klusmeier, an Orthodontist from Fort Smith, Arkansas, introduced the custom tray bleaching. However, it was not until 1989 that Haywood and Heymann published an article in support of this method. Carbamide peroxide with a shelf life of one to two years, as opposed to hydrogen peroxide with a shelf life one to two months, was seen as a more stable agent for whitening teeth.

== Society and culture ==
Teeth whitening has become the most promoted and mentioned methodology in cosmetic dentistry. In excess of 100 million Americans brighten their teeth using different methods; spending $15 billion in 2010. The US Food and Drug Administration only endorses gels that are under 6% hydrogen peroxide or 16% or less of carbamide peroxide. The Scientific Committee on Consumer Safety of the EU consider gels containing higher fixations can be dangerous.

As per European Council guidelines, only a certified dental professional can lawfully give tooth whitening products utilizing 0.1–6% hydrogen peroxide, provided the patient is 18 years of age or older. In 2010, the UK General Dental Council became concerned of the "risk to patient safety from poor quality tooth whitening being carried out by untrained or poorly trained staff." A public attitudes survey, conducted by the GDC, showed that 83% of people support "policies of regulating tooth whitening to protect patient safety and prosecuting illegal practice." A group of dental professionals and associations called The Tooth Whitening Information Group (TWIG) was founded to advance protected and beneficial tooth whitening information and assistance to the general population. Reports can be made to the TWIG through their website with respect to any individual giving unlawful tooth whitening services, or if an individual has personally undergone treatment done by a non-dental professional.

In Brazil, all whitening items are classed as cosmetics (Degree II). There are worries that this will increase abuse of whitening products and thus there have been calls for reanalysis.

According to research, tooth whitening can produce positive changes in young participants' Oral Health Related Quality of Life (OHRQoL) in aesthetic areas such as smiling, laughing, and showing teeth without embarrassment. However, its main side-effect, tooth sensitivity, negatively affects quality of life.

== See also ==
- Gum depigmentation
- Oral hygiene
