= Hismile =

Australian toothpaste company

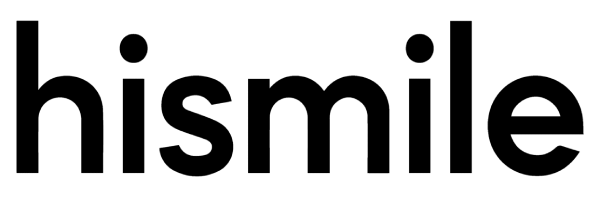
- Type: Private
- Industry: Dental
- Headquarters: Queensland, Australia
- Key people: Nik Mirkovic; Alex Tomic
- Products: Toothpaste; Toothbrushes; Lip balm
- Website: hismileteeth.com

Hismile is an Australian toothpaste company based in Queensland, Australia. Founded in 2014, the company is best known for their wide and unusual range of toothpaste flavours, and digital marketing strategy.

Initially launching with a teeth-whitening kit as the brand's only product, HiSmile has extended their range to include flavoured toothpastes, mouthwashes, lip balms, electric toothbrushes, and additional whitening products. HiSmile also often engage in influencer marketing and have recruited celebrities including Kylie Jenner, Conor McGregor, and Anna Paul to promote their products.

== Flavours ==
Hismile's toothpaste, lip balm, mouthwash, and dental floss products have been released in a wide variety of rotating flavours, including watermelon, blue raspberry, mango sorbet, coconut whip, red velvet, smooth mint and peach iced tea.

Hismile have also launched a number of flavours in partnership with other brands or influencers, with flavours inspired by KFC (fried chicken), Reese's (peanut butter cup), Lucky Charms, Miffy (sweet apple), and The Simpsons (blue slushie).

== Controversies ==
In June 2026, Hismile was issued seven infringement notices and fined up to $138,600 AUD by the Australian Competition and Consumer Commission for misleading advertising campaigns. Hismile admitted to having posed employees as random shoppers in videos posted to social media, as well as suggesting that their since-discontinued Tooth Gloss product could remove stains from teeth instead of only covering them temporarily.
