= Running room =

Dentistry terminology

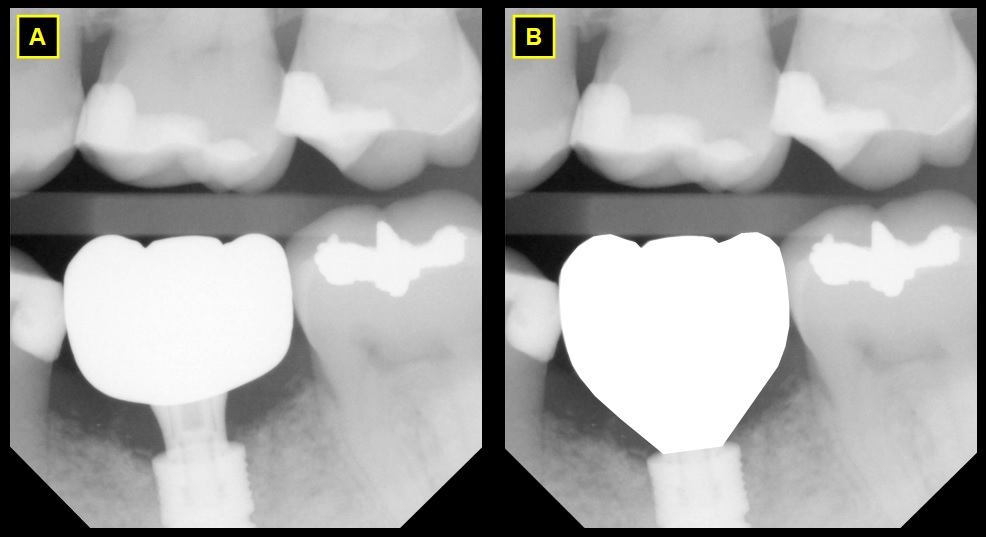
A This radiograph demonstrates an emergence profile that ignores the gingival tissue, generally presenting clinically with black triangles and food traps on either side of the implant. The crown (white) emerges supragingivally and does not take advantage of the available running room of 3mm. Instead, a 3mm ti-base was used. B This emergence profile respects the gingival architecture and emerges fully subgingivally.

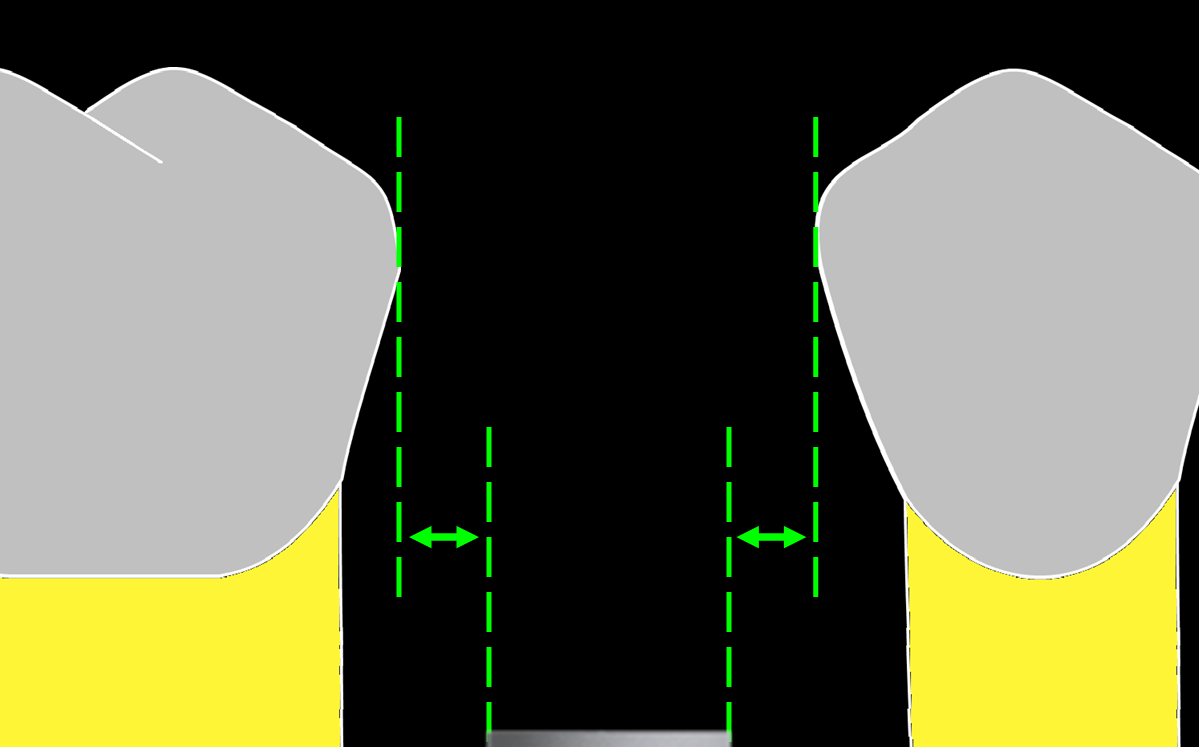
Implant platforms are circular in nature and generally exhibit a smaller diameter than the eventual crowns to be placed. Because crowns are wider, the contour of the crown is said to emerge (get wider as it ascends). In this facial view, it is desirable that the full emergence occur under the gum line (subgingivally) rather than above the gum line (supragingivally). The vertical dimension between the implant platform and the gingival margin is termed running room.

In implant dentistry, running room refers to the apico-coronal distance between the platform of a dental implant and the gingival margin. It is a critical factor in restorative implant dentistry because it is effectively the "vertical distance [available subgingivaly] to make a transition from the smaller diameter prosthetic platform of an implant to the larger cross-sectional cervical shape of the tooth being restored." The term was coined by Jonathan Zamzok, a Manhattan prosthodontist, in the late 1990s.

== Rationale ==
Adequate running room is necessary to allow the implant-supported crown to exhibit a tooth-shaped contour despite the smaller diameter and circular nature of implant platforms. For example, the mean mesial-distal dimension of a maxillary central incisor at the points at which it contacts the adjacent teeth is 8.6 mm, and the mean mesial-distal dimension of the same tooth at the cementoenamel junction (CEJ) is 6.4 mm. Even though the implant diameter chosen for the maxillary central incisor is usually around 4–5 mm, the supragingival tooth contours need to mimic those of the natural tooth if esthetic success is intended.

As the anatomical crown and root tapers towards the apex, the mesial-distal dimension decreases, and so the mean mesial-distal dimension at the marginal crest of bone, which lies approximately 2 mm apical to the CEJ, is smaller. The tooth has the apico-coronal distance from the marginal crest of bone to the contact point in order to increase from the much narrower mesial-distal dimension to the greater mesial-distal dimension, and this distance is subgingival (below the gum line). Running room refers to this subgingival apico-coronal distance.

In general, it is recommended that implants be given approximately 3mm of running room in compliance with the rule of thumb that implants should be placed as deep as necessary and as shallow as possible.

When implants are placed too palatally or lingually due to aberrant anatomical landmarks, bone resorption or surgical error, it is wise to place the implant more apically to increase the available running room in order to allow for a more convex emergence profile and avoid a buccal ridge-lap of the prosthetic crown in fixed partial denture cases. Similarly, when narrower than normal implant connections are used, deeper placement may enhance one's ability to generate an optimal emergence profile.
