= Embrasure (dentistry) =

V-shaped valleys between adjacent teeth

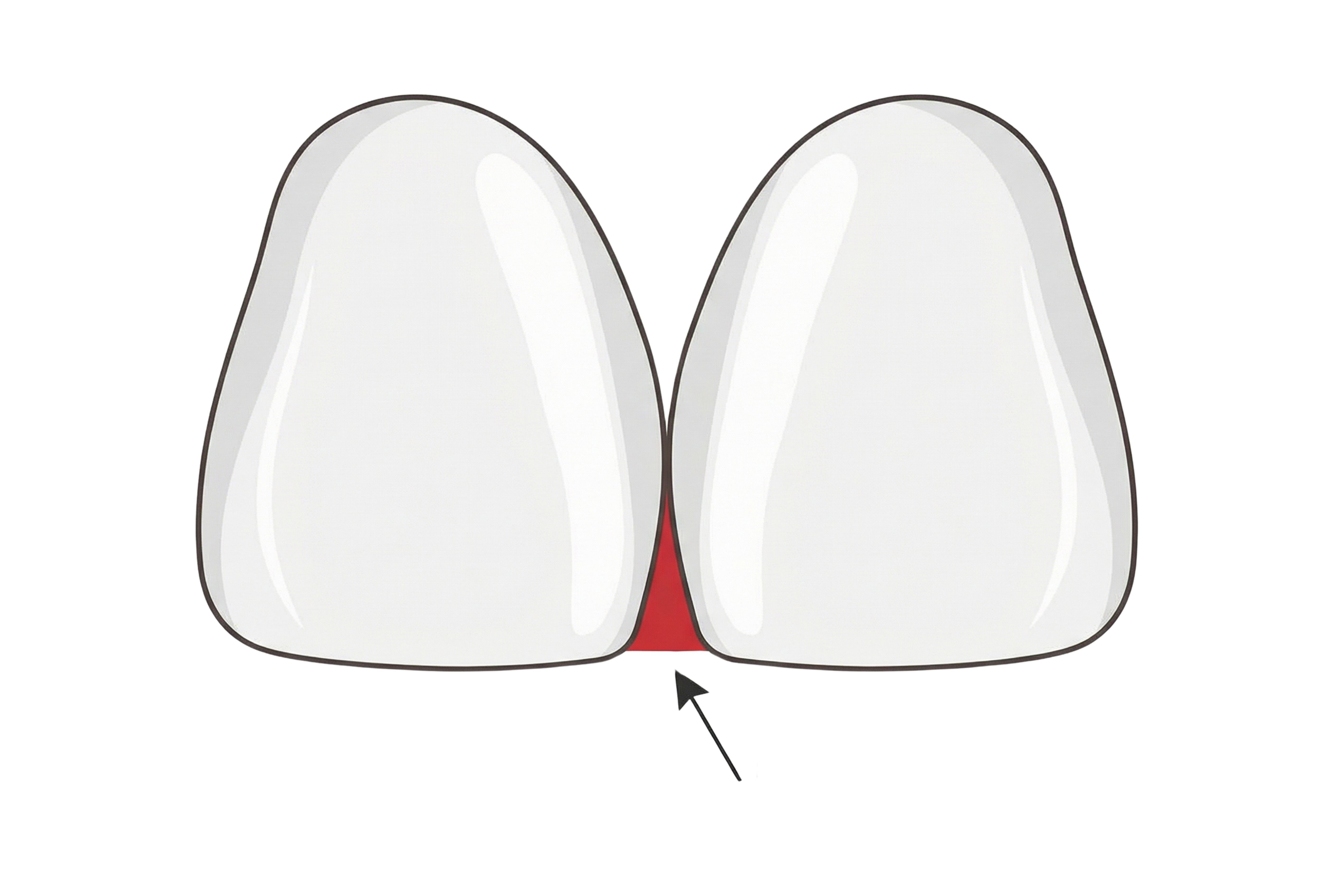
Diagram showing the incisal embrasure between the upper central incisors, highlighted in red with an arrow pointing to it.

In dentistry, embrasures are V-shaped valleys between adjacent teeth. They provide a spill way for food to escape during chewing which essentially aids in the self-cleansing process. They also prevent food from being forced through the contact area which might cause food packing and periodontal pain and permit a slight amount of stimulation to the gingiva.

When two teeth in the same arch are in contact, their curvatures adjacent to the contact areas form spillway spaces which are known as embrasures.

== See also ==
- Angularis nigra ("black triangle")
