= Stippling (dentistry) =

Texture feature of the gingiva

Photograph of a complete denture wax-up. The excessively detailed stippled surface texture of the base area (false gums) can be observed, mimicking the physiologic stippling of gum tissue in nature. Note how there is minimal to no stippling on the marginal gingiva, which is the millimeter or so of pink immediately adjacent to the teeth.

The gingiva often possess a textured surface that is referred to as being stippled (engraved points). Stippling only presents on the attached gingiva bound to underlying alveolar bone, not the freely moveable alveolar mucosa or free gingiva. Stippling used to be thought to indicate health, but it has since been shown that smooth gingiva is not an indication of disease, unless it is smooth due to a loss of previously existing stippling.

Stippling is a consequence of the microscopic elevations and depressions of the surface of the gingival tissue due to the connective tissue projections within the tissue. The degree of keratinization and the prominence of stippling appear to be related. To be more specific, stippling occurs at sites of fusion of the epithelial ridges (also known as rete pegs – depression of epithelium) and correspond to the fusion of the valleys created by the connective tissue papillae (elevation of connective tissue papilla). An example of stippling could be dots found on a basketball or an orange.
