= Gummy smile =

Show of the anterior gingiva above the teeth when smiling

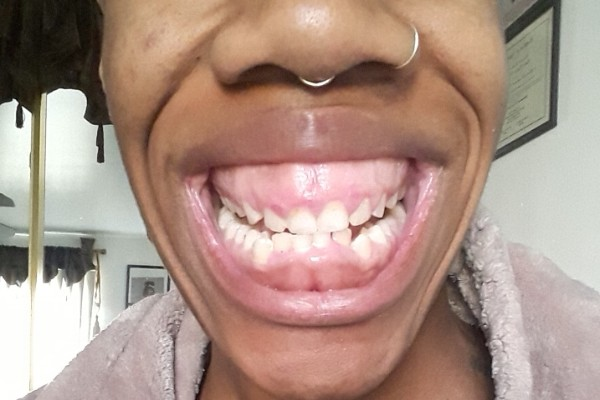
A case of severe gummy smile as seen in a young woman

Gummy smile, also known as excessive gingival display, is a smile that shows gum under the upper lip. It is a common clinical condition, which can be caused by an abnormal dental eruption (delayed passive eruption), hyperfunction of the upper lip elevator muscle, excessive vertical growth of the maxilla bone, over-eruption of the maxillary anterior teeth, or a combination of the above described factors. While there is no definitive, established standard for a gummy smile, it is widely classified as the exposure of more than 2 mm of tissue above the upper central incisors during a full smile. Several treatment options have been proposed to enhance the smile display and to reduce the gingival exposure. Gummy smiles affect about 10% of the US population aged 20-30 years old, being more prevalent in women than men.

== Treatment ==
Treatment option include orthodontics, surgery (gingivectomy), botulinum toxin A injections, and micro-autologous fat transplantation (MAFT).

Botox is considered one of the safest and most widely used injectables. Botox (BTX-A) has been successful in the treatment of gummy smiles. Botox lip flip can last for an average of 6 months. The material is injected into the hyperactive muscles of upper lip, which causes a reduction in the upward movement of lip thus resulting in a smile with a less exposure of gingiva. Botox is usually injected in the three lip elevator muscles that converge on the lateral side of the ala of the nose; levator labii superioris muscle (LLS), levator labii superioris alaeque nasi muscle (LLSAN), and zygomaticus minor muscle (ZMi).
