= Newell Sill Jenkins =

American dentist

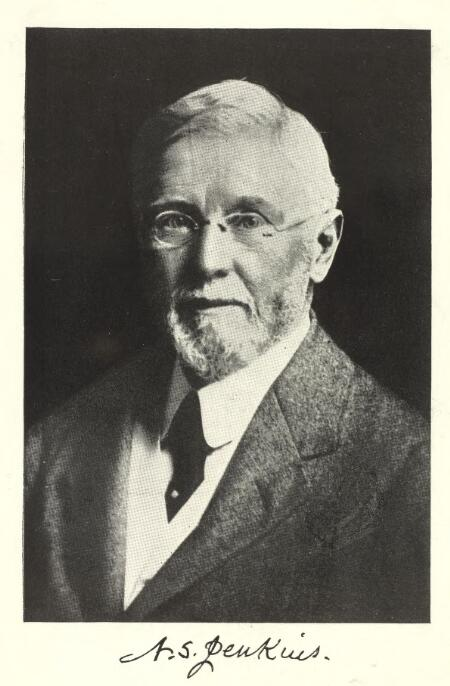
Newell Sill Jenkins

Newell Sill Jenkins (* December 29, 1840 Falmouth, Massachusetts — September 25, 1919 Le Havre, France) was an American dentist who practiced most of his life in Dresden, Germany. He developed and improved the Jenkins porcelain enamel, thus making a composition of porcelain paste into porcelain inlays, dental crowns and bridges. He is thus the founder of aesthetic dentistry.

== Biography ==
Jenkins comes from a shipping family. Immediately after completing his studies at the Baltimore College of Dental Surgery of the University of Maryland, he opened in 1863 his dental practice in Bangor, Maine. He corresponded with Frank Abbott, a practicing dentist in Berlin who was one of Europe's most renowned dentists. Abbott encouraged him to emigrate to Germany. November 20, 1866 he emigrated with his family to Dresden, where he practiced 1866-1909. Since 1893 the Royal Saxon Privy Councillor appointed dentist was owner of the famous villa Thorwald in Dresden's Loschwitz, For years he practiced one month per year in Vienna and Warsaw. In 1907 he moved to Paris, where he continued his research and enjoyed wide recognition. Twice he was elected president of the American Dental Club of Paris. He received numerous awards from Germany, England, France, USA, Norway, the Netherlands and Spain. 1916, during World War I, he returned to the US. September 18, 1919, after the war, he entered a sailboat in New York to spend the winter months in southern France. However, this was not granted. He died of a heart attack upon arrival at the port of Le Havre on September 25, 1919. His remains were transferred to the United States, where he was buried in Bangor.

== Friendship with Richard Wagner ==
His clientele includes not only members of European royal houses, but also celebrities like Richard Wagner, a friend of Jenkins. Jenkins demanded no fee for his dental treatment, making him very likeable by Wagner, as Wagner was financially clammy. "It’s not impossible that I will decide to emigrate forever with my whole family and my last works to America," Wagner wrote, as he experienced the financial disaster of Der Ring des Nibelungen (The Ring of the Nibelung) performance at the first Festival 1876 at the Bayreuth Festspielhaus. Wagner talked about his plans to emigrate to the US with Jenkins and put in a three-page letter the conditions ensuring his existence beyond the ocean and which would have brought his opera Parsifal to the Americans. Thanks to Jenkins’ persuasion Wagner cancelled his plans to emigrate to America. Parsifal premiered at the second Bayreuth Festival on July 26, 1882 in Bayreuth.

== Career ==
Jenkins was for a long time ignored by dental historians despite his high achievements in dentistry. He published 32 scientific articles about improving aesthetic tooth restoration with porcelain fillings, methods that were partly patented.

=== Introduction of the rubber dam in Germany ===
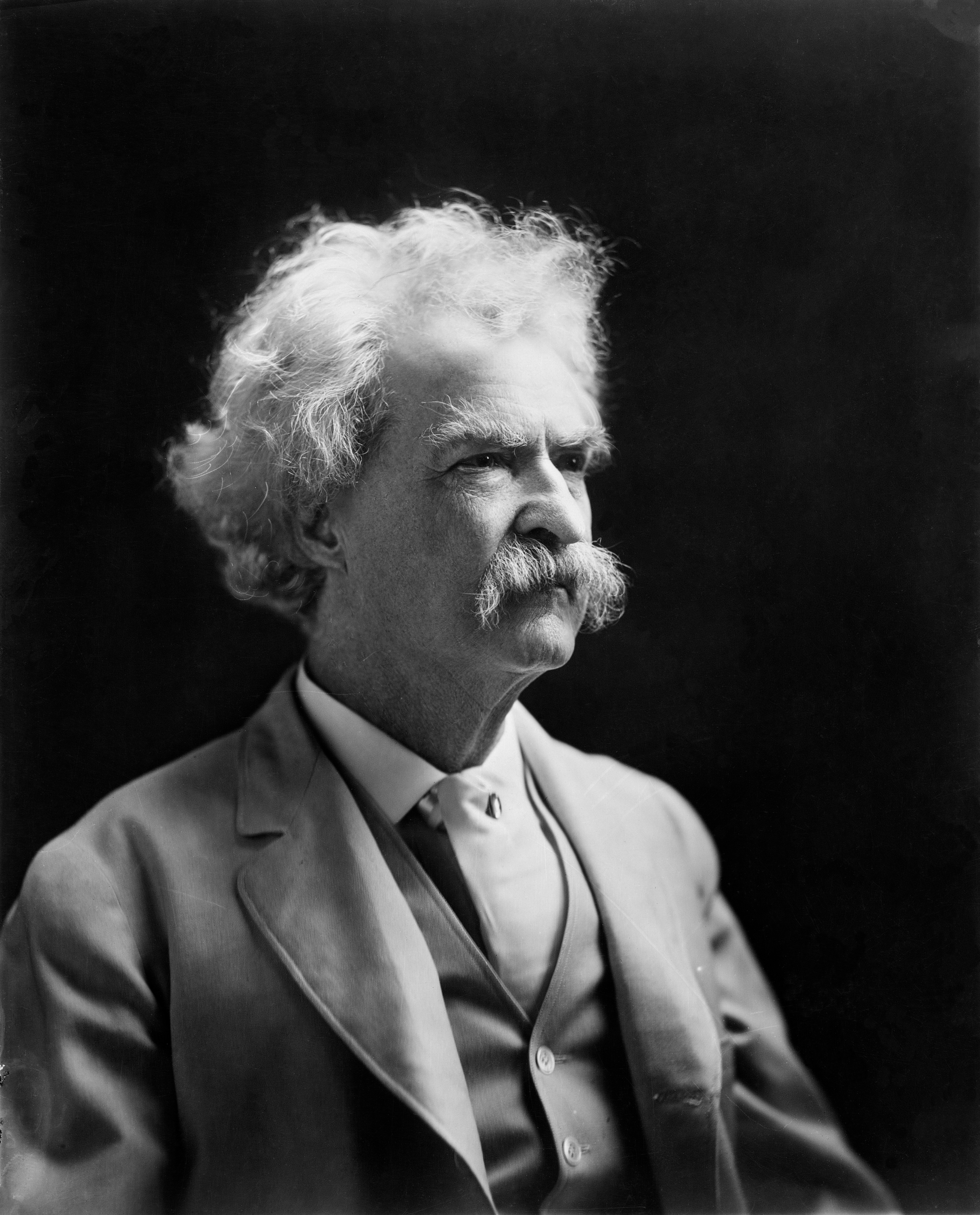
Mark Twain

Jenkins had his first success introducing the rubber dam in Germany, two years after it had been developed 1864 by the New York dentist Sanford Christie Barnum. The rubber dam is an elastic band, which isolates the tooth to be treated from the oral cavity especially against liquids and saliva. Originally it was used to keep the working area dry because at that time there was no dental suction apparatus.

=== Development of porcelain masses ===
Jenkins developed and improved porcelain enamel, thus making a composition of porcelain paste into porcelain inlays, dental crowns and bridges and the associated processing equipment. It was helpful living close to Sächsische Porzellanmanufaktur Dresden (Saxon Porcelain Manufactory in Dresden). He also developed steel drills, which were coated with diamond dust, to create a smooth cavity. The porcelain inlays opened for the first time the possibility to produce tooth-colored anterior restorations and thus initiated the era of esthetic dentistry. At that time fillings were usually made of gold in the anterior region. For the production and distribution of "Jenkins Porcelain Enamel" he founded the manufactory Klewe & Co. His personal friend, a certain Samuel Langhorne Clemens bought the manufacturing and distribution rights for the US market. This man became known by his pseudonym as the writer Mark Twain.

=== Development of the toothpaste Kolynos ===
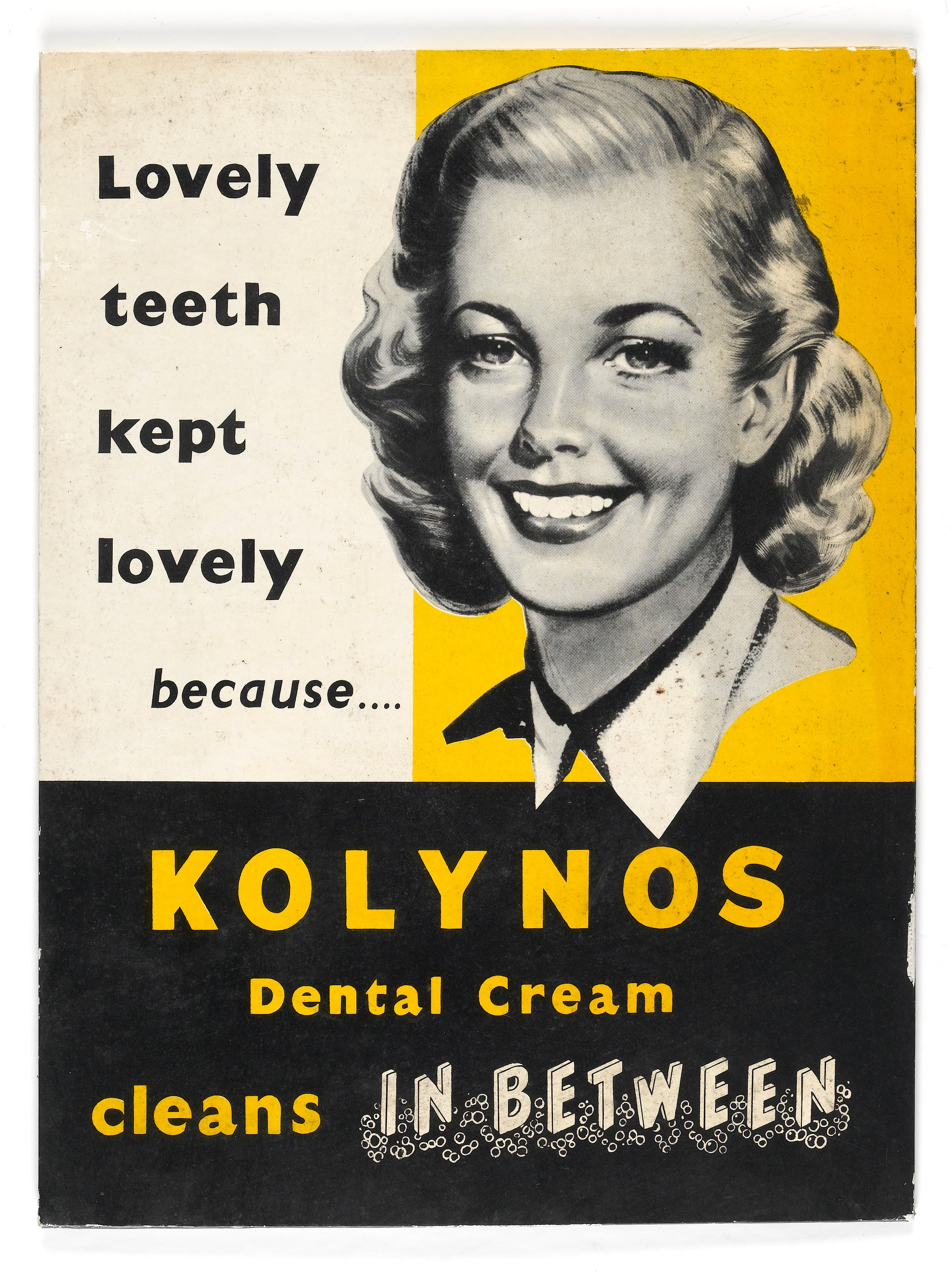
Promotional poster for the Kolynos toothpaste from the 1940s

Together with Willoughby D. Miller, who set up in 1890 the pioneering and still valid theory that bacteria of the oral flora degrade carbohydrates to acids, that damage the enamel and allow bacteria to access and destroy the dentin by caries, Jenkins developed a toothpaste and named it Kolynos, the first toothpaste containing disinfectants. The name´s origin is Greek Kolyo nosos (κωλύω νόσος), meaning "disease prevention". Numerous attempts to produce the toothpaste by pharmacists in Europe were uneconomic. After returning to the US, he continued experimenting with Harry Ward Foote (1875-1942), professor of chemistry at Sheffield Chemical Laboratory of Yale University. After 17 years of development of Kolynos and clinical trials Jenkins retired and transferred the production and distribution to his son Leonard A. Jenkins, who brought the first toothpaste tubes on the market on April 13, 1908. Within a few years the company expanded in North America, Latin America, Europe and the Far East. A branch operation opened in 1909 in London. In 1937 Kolynos was produced in 22 countries and sold in 88 countries. In recent times Kolynos is widespread mainly in South America and in Hungary. Colgate-Palmolive took over the product of American Home Products in 1995 at a cost of one billion US dollars.

== Selected publications ==
- Reminiscences of Newell Sill Jenkins, archive.org.
- Thomas S. Grey (27 July 2009). Richard Wagner and His World. Princeton University Press. pp. 237 ff. ISBN 978-1-4008-3178-4.
- Newell Sill Jenkins, Porcelain Enamel Inlays. Collection: Dental Cosmos, Volume 40, Issue 8, August, 1898, pp. 633–635.
- Newell Sill Jenkins, Porcelain Enamel Inlays. Collection: Dental Cosmos, Volume 41, Issue 9, September, 1899, pp. 888–892.
- Newell Sill Jenkins, Porcelain Enamel Inlays. Collection: Dental Cosmos, Volume 42, Issue 11, November, 1900, pp. 1109–1111.
- Newell Sill Jenkins, Porcelain Enamel. Collection: Dental Cosmos, Volume 44, Issue 5, May, 1902, pp. 456–458.
- Newell Sill Jenkins, The Porcelain Inlay in Europe. Collection: Dental Cosmos, Volume 58, Issue 3, March, 1916, pp. 269–272.
- A. F. Brosius, Porcelain, with Special Consideration of Jenkins' Inlay Porcelain. Collection: Dental Cosmos, Volume 54, Issue 2, February, 1912, pp. 243–244.
