= Gum depigmentation =

Procedure used in cosmetic dentistry

Gum depigmentation, also known as gum bleaching, is a procedure used in cosmetic dentistry to lighten or remove black spots or patches on the gums consisting of melanin. Melanin in skin is very common in inhabitants in many parts of the world due to genetic factors. Melanin pigmentation in skin, oral mucosa, inner ear and other organs is a detoxification mechanism. Some toxic agents bind to melanin and will move out of the tissue with the ageing cells and are expelled to the tissue surfaces. Also in the gums and oral mucosa a visible pigmentation is most often caused by genetic factors, but also by tobacco smoking or in a few cases by long-term use of certain medications. If stopping smoking or change of medication do not solve the problem with a disfigurating melanin pigmentation, a surgical operation may be performed. The procedure itself can involve laser ablation techniques.

== Laser gum depigmentation ==
Melanocytes are cells which reside in the basal layer of the gingival epithelium. These cells produce melanin, which are pigments that cause light or dark brown spots in gums and oral mucosa. The most common cause is genetic factors or tobacco smoking, Smoker's melanosis. If the melanin pigmentation is found in a person smoking cigarettes, the most effective way to get rid of the pigmentation is to stop smoking. Most of the patients are free from the melanin pigmentation after 3 months. A dental laser can target and ablate the melanocytes, thus reducing the production of melanin in the gingival tissue. Following laser depigmentation, the gingiva heals by secondary intention. This results in a lighter and more uniform color of the gums. A study found that (Er,Cr:YSGG) laser was effective and there were no signs of re-pigmentation after a 6-month follow up period.

== Chemical Depigmentation ==
Chemical depigmentation is a cosmetic dental procedure aimed at reducing or eliminating dark pigmentation. During this procedure, chemicals such as acids or peels are applied to the pigmented areas of the gums to break down and remove melanin deposits. However, this method is used less frequently today due to possible side effects and the availability of more modern and less invasive methods, such as laser therapy or surgical excision.

== Scalpel Gum Depigmentation ==
Scalpel gum depigmentation, or surgical gum depigmentation, is a cosmetic dental procedure. During the procedure, a periodontist or oral surgeon physically removes the pigmented layer of gum tissue with a scalpel, exposing the lighter tissue beneath it. This method is effective but may require a longer recovery period than non-surgical methods such as laser therapy. It is usually recommended in cases where laser therapy or chemical depigmentation may be unsuitable or impractical.

== See also ==
- Tooth whitening
