= Mucogingival junction =

Area of union between the hard and soft inner lining of the mouth

A mucogingival junction is an anatomical feature found on the intraoral mucosa. The mucosa of the cheeks and floor of the mouth are freely moveable and fragile, whereas the mucosa around the teeth and on the palate are firm and keratinized. Where the two tissue types meet is known as a mucogingival junction.

There are three mucogingival junctions: on the facial of the maxilla and on both the facial and lingual of the mandible. The palatal gingiva of the maxilla is continuous with the tissue of the palate, which is bound down to the palatal bones. Because the palate is devoid of freely moveable alveolar mucosa, there is no mucogingival junction.

== Clinical importance ==
The clinical importance of the mucogingival junction is in measuring the width of attached gingiva. Attached gingiva is important because it is bound very tightly to the underlying alveolar bone and provides protection to the mucosa during functional use of the structures of the oral cavity during function, such as chewing. Without attached gingiva, the freely moveable alveolar mucosa, being more fragile, would suffer injury during eating and cleansing activities, such as brushing of the teeth.

The width of attached tissue is critical, because the more there is available provides a greater sense of protection against the aforementioned insults to the tissue. Using the mucogingival junction as the boundary demarcating the apical border of the attached gingiva, a periodontal probe is inserted into the gingival sulcus to measure how much of the keratinized gingiva coronal to the mucogingival junction is in fact attached to the underlying bone. The depth of the gingival sulcus, determined by the depth to which the probe enters the sulcus, is not attached to the underlying bone, and is subtracted from the total height of the keratinized tissue.

Thus, if the entire height of the keratinized gingiva, from the free gingival margin to the mucogingival junction is 8 mm, and the probing depth on the tooth at that location is 2 mm, the effective width of attached gingiva is 6 mm.

If the probe enters the sulcus and can descend up to or beyond the mucogingival junction, this is called a mucogingival defect.
