= Interdental papilla =

Part of the gingiva between teeth

Details

Identifiers
- Latin: papilla gingivalis
- TA98: A05.1.01.110
- TA2: 2792
- FMA: 77186

The interdental papilla (also called the interdental gingiva) is the small triangular piece of gum tissue that sits between two neighbouring teeth. Most people recognise it as the pink, pointed or rounded tissue visible in the gaps between teeth.

== Function ==
The main job of the interdental papilla is to fill the space between teeth just below the point where two teeth touch each other. This prevents food from becoming trapped and stuck between the teeth; they assume a conical shape for the anterior teeth and a blunted shape buccolingually for the posterior teeth.

The shape of the papilla varies depending on where it is in the mouth: * Between the front teeth'(incisors and canines), it is pointed and cone-shaped. * Between the back teeth (premolars and molars), it is flatter and more rounded from front to back.

A missing papilla is often visible as a small triangular gap between adjacent teeth. Dentists will sometimes refer to this gap as a 'black triangle'. It can sometimes be corrected with orthodontic treatment. The relationship of interdental bone to the interproximal contact point between adjacent teeth is a determining factor in whether the interdental papilla will be present. If a distance greater than 8 mm exists between the interdental bone and the interproximal contact, usually no papilla will be present. If the distance is 5 mm or less, then a papilla will almost always be present.

== Morphological Variations of the Interdental Papilla in Anterior and Posterior Regions ==
The morphology of the interdental papilla differs between anterior and posterior regions. At the anterior teeth (incisors and canines), the interdental papillae are pyramidal-shaped. Conversely at the posterior teeth (premolars and molars), the interdental papillae are flatter and broader. In addition, there is presence of ‘col’ in the back teeth region, which is a concave saddle region which functions to join the buccal (towards the cheek) and lingual (towards the tongue) papillae. The different shapes of interdental papillae are determined by 3 factors, namely the course of cemento-enamel junction, the interproximal tooth surface width and the contact areas between adjacent teeth.The scalloped shape of gingival margin is due to the presence of interdental papilla.

In terms of papillary height, it has the greatest height at the central incisors because the interproximal contact area is the most coronal (direction towards incisal edge) between the central incisors. The papillary height gradually decreases towards the back teeth region as the interproximal contact area gradually shifts more apically (direction towards the root). In terms of ‘col’ width, it increases from the front teeth region to the back teeth region.

== Disease ==
In periodontal disease (gum disease), the gum tissue — including the interdental papillae — can become swollen and inflamed. This swelling is caused by the body's immune response to bacterial infection, which leads to a build-up of fluid in the soft tissue. If left untreated, the papilla can eventually be destroyed, contributing to the appearance of black triangles.
