= Angularis nigra =

Small triangle-shaped gap which often occurs between the teeth, near the gums

Angularis nigra between mandibular central incisors

Angularis nigra between maxillary central incisors

Angularis nigra, Latin for 'black angle', also known as open gingival embrasures, and colloquially known as "black triangle", is the space or gap seen at the cervical embrasure, below the contact point of some teeth. The interdental papilla does not fully enclose the space, leading to an aperture between adjacent teeth. This gap has many causes including gingival recession, and gingival withdrawal post-orthodontic work. Interdental "black triangles" were rated as the third-most-disliked aesthetic problem below caries and crown margins. Treatment of angularis nigra often requires an interdisciplinary approach, involving periodontal, orthodontic and restorative treatment. Possible treatments to correct angularis nigra include addition of composite resin in the space, veneer placement, or gum graft. Angularis nigra is generally only treated based on the aesthetic preference of the patient (although serious gum recession may warrant periodontal treatment).

Previously, lack of proper terminology to report this condition was an issue, often colloquially termed the "black triangle"; angularis nigra has been proposed as a term to describe the appearance.

There are several risk factors leading to the development of black triangles. Papillae dimension can be changed due to any of the following reasons:

1. Inter-proximal space between teeth; diverging roots can result in the presence of an interproximal space when the contact point between the two clinical crowns is situated too incisally, diverging roots may also be a result of orthodontic treatment.

2. The increased distance between inter-proximal contact position to bone crest, example to that is the naturally occurring diastema.

3. Gingiva biotype; thick and thin tissues often respond differently to inflammation and trauma, thin gingiva is more liable to recession following restoration / crown preparation / periodontal or implant surgery.

4. Patient's age; the gingiva recede with aging which can cause an open gingival embrasure.

5. Periodontal disease and loss of attachment, resulting in recession.

6. Tooth morphology and abnormal crown and restoration shape; a clinical crown that tends to be triangular in shape can also result in partial interproximal space.
