= Ovarian squamous cell carcinoma =

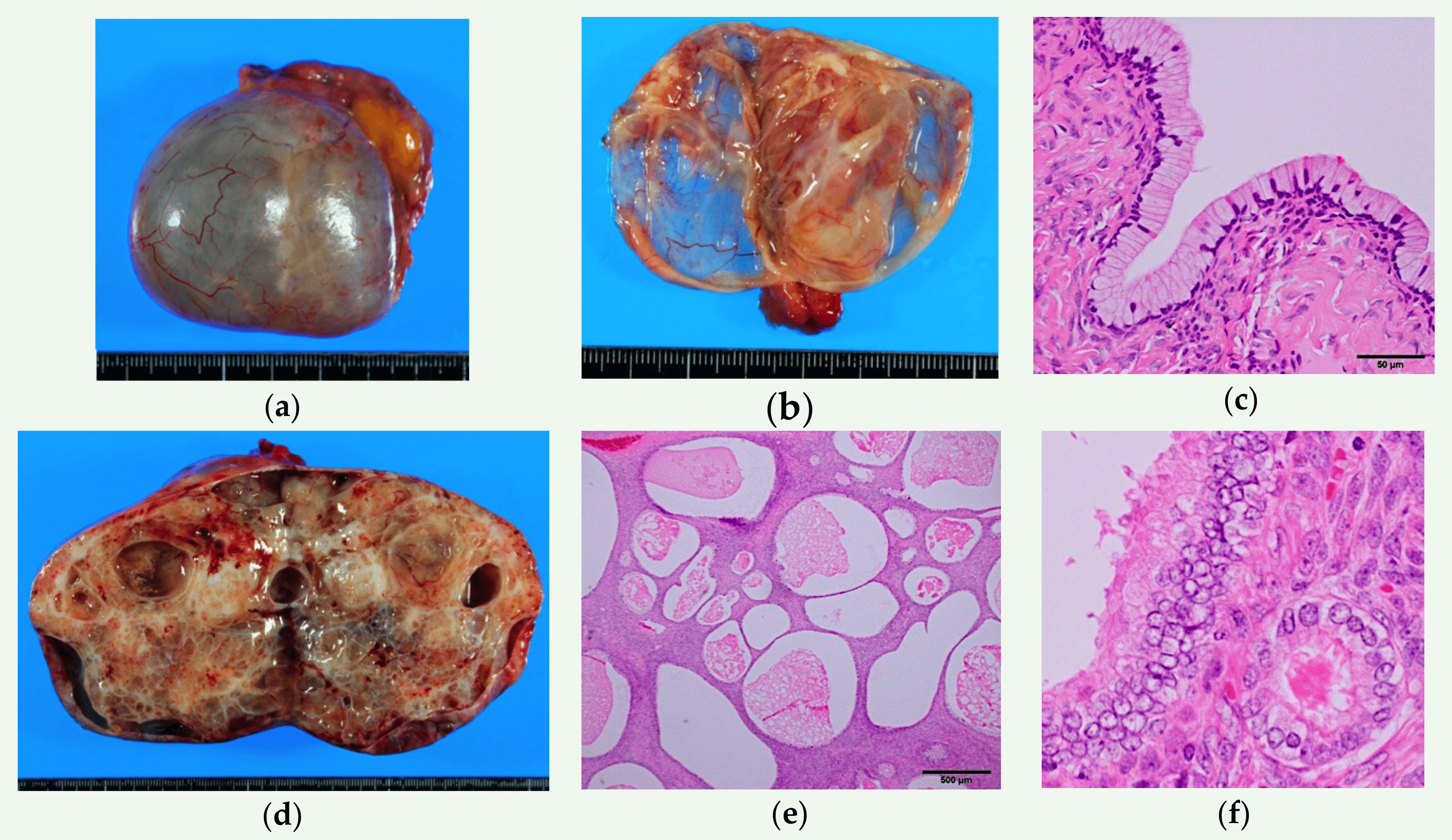
- Squamous Ovarian Cell Carcinoma
- Symptoms: Vaginal pain and discomfort, pain during sex, abdominal pain, post-menopausal bleeding,
- Usual onset: Females older than 45 years old
- Causes: Non-pre-existing ovarian lesions (primary) or pre-existing ovarian lesions (Mature cystic teratoma, endometriosis, Brenner tumor)
- Diagnostic method: CT-scans, Ultrasound, biopsy
- Prevention: PAP test, Preventive healthcare visits
- Treatment: Surgery, Ionizing Radiation, Chemoradiotherapy, Immunotherapy, Platinum-based chemotherapy
- Frequency: account 1% of ovarian cancer

Ovarian squamous cell carcinoma (oSCC) or squamous ovarian carcinoma (SOC) is a rare tumor that accounts for 1% of ovarian cancers. Included in the World Health Organization's classification of ovarian cancer, it mainly affects women above 45 years of age. Survival depends on how advanced the disease is and how different or similar the individual cancer cells are.

Squamous ovarian carcinoma is a recognized but uncommon diagnosis, often originating from a transformation of mature cystic teratoma (MCT). Unlike other squamous cell carcinomas, factors like UV exposure and tobacco use play a less significant role. Chronic inflammation in MCT and human papillomavirus (HPV) infection are linked to its development. The tumor emerges through metaplasia of the ovarian surface epithelium. While MCT is the primary source in most cases, others are associated with endometriosis or Brenner tumor, and rare metastasis from other organs can also lead to squamous ovarian carcinoma.

Treatment for oSCC involves surgery, chemotherapy, and radiotherapy, but efficacy of these treatments is unclear. While there is no well-studied chemotherapy regimen for ovarian SCCs, platinum-based chemotherapy is often used.

The earliest reported instance of pure primary SCC was by Ben-Baruchet in 1988; oSSC emerging from pre-existing lesions have been recorded since the early 1950s.

== Pathology ==
=== Mature cystic teratoma ===
Ovarian Squamous Cell Carcinoma development from MCTO has been in linked to failure during meiosis I and II.

Mature cystic teratoma (MCT) is a benign (non-cancerous) tumor that develops from at least two of the embryonic germ cell layers. They are characterized by a lining of epithelium and can contain many different tissue types.

Although the majority of MCT cases are non-malignant, approximately 0.17-2% may undergo malignant transformation, with squamous cell carcinoma being the most prevalent, constituting 80% of such transformations. The clinical presentation of oSCC development within MCT lacks specificity, often resulting in the inadvertent discovery of early-stage tumors during routine examinations or postoperative assessments. In advanced cases, patients may exhibit palpable masses, abdominal swelling, and pain, potentially leading to acute abdominal complications due to tumor involvement.

=== Brenner tumor ===
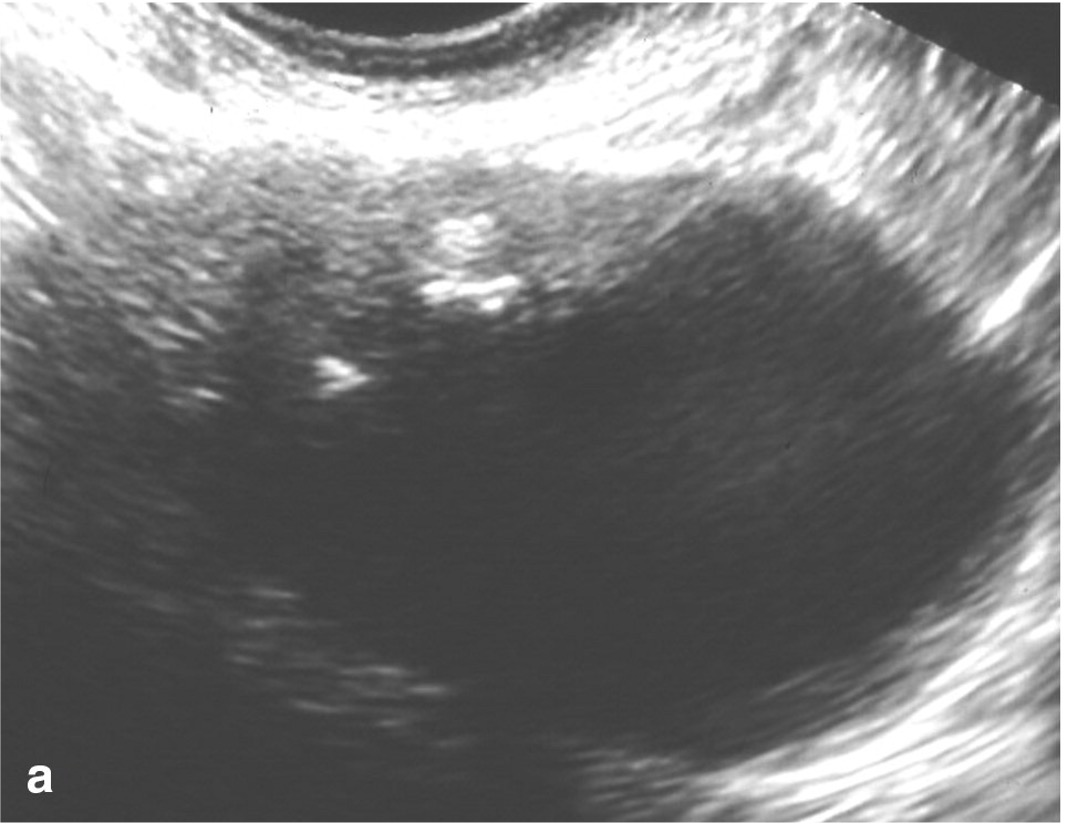
Benign mixed Brenner tumor and mucinous cystadenoma of the right ovary. (a) Transvaginal ultrasound images show mixed cystic and solid components, with calcifications in the solid portion (arrow); (b) Macroscopic evaluation revealed an ovary partially replaced by a solid and cystic tumor

Brenner tumors (BT) are infrequent ovarian growths composed of specialized ovarian cells surrounded by dense fibrous tissue. Typically small (less than 2 cm), these tumors are often discovered incidentally in women without apparent symptoms. However, when a BT is borderline or malignant, indicating a potential for cancer, it may lead to symptoms such as an abdominal lump, abdominal pain, and post-menopausal bleeding. Less common signs include nausea, vomiting, back pain, bowel problems, reduced appetite, and weight loss.

Differentiating between benign (non-cancerous) and malignant (potentially cancerous) BTs poses a challenge as they appear similarly in medical images. The definitive diagnosis involves examining tissue under a microscope (histopathology). Benign BTs exhibit a consistent fibrous structure, a distinctive characteristic. They may also manifest as a cystic mass with multiple compartments, particularly associated with other ovarian growths.

=== Endometriosis ===
oSCC tumors from endometriosis are rare. There are criteria to determine if oSCC comes from endometriosis. Individuals with this type of cancer are usually under 50, have a more severe form of the disease, and often feel abdominal pain.

Conditions for verifying whether the SCC originated as endometriosis or not
Development from the same ovary	Growth inside endometriosis tissue	Presence of endometriosis indicators	Microscopic observation of benign epithelium
Both endometriosis and squamous epithelial cells must develop in the same ovary.; The correlation between tissues from benign endometriosis and malignant SCC should show a pattern similar to a malignant tumor that originates from the endometrium.	The malignant tumor has to grow within the tissue of endometriosis.; It should not be transferred from the outside of endometriosis to the inside.	Tissue characteristics indicative of endometriosis, such as endometrial stroma, evidence of old hemorrhage, hemosiderin pigmentation, etc., need to be present.	Microscopic examination should reveal a part changing to benign epithelium.

== Screening and diagnosis ==
Similar to other ovarian cancers patients can undergo a series of tests to identify characteristics and/or markers. This test includes a pelvic exam, imaging (CT, MRI, ultrasound), blood test, and in some cases biopsy with histopathology. Diagnosing this condition remains challenging as preoperative imaging and laboratory tests lack specific indicators.

=== Computed tomography ===
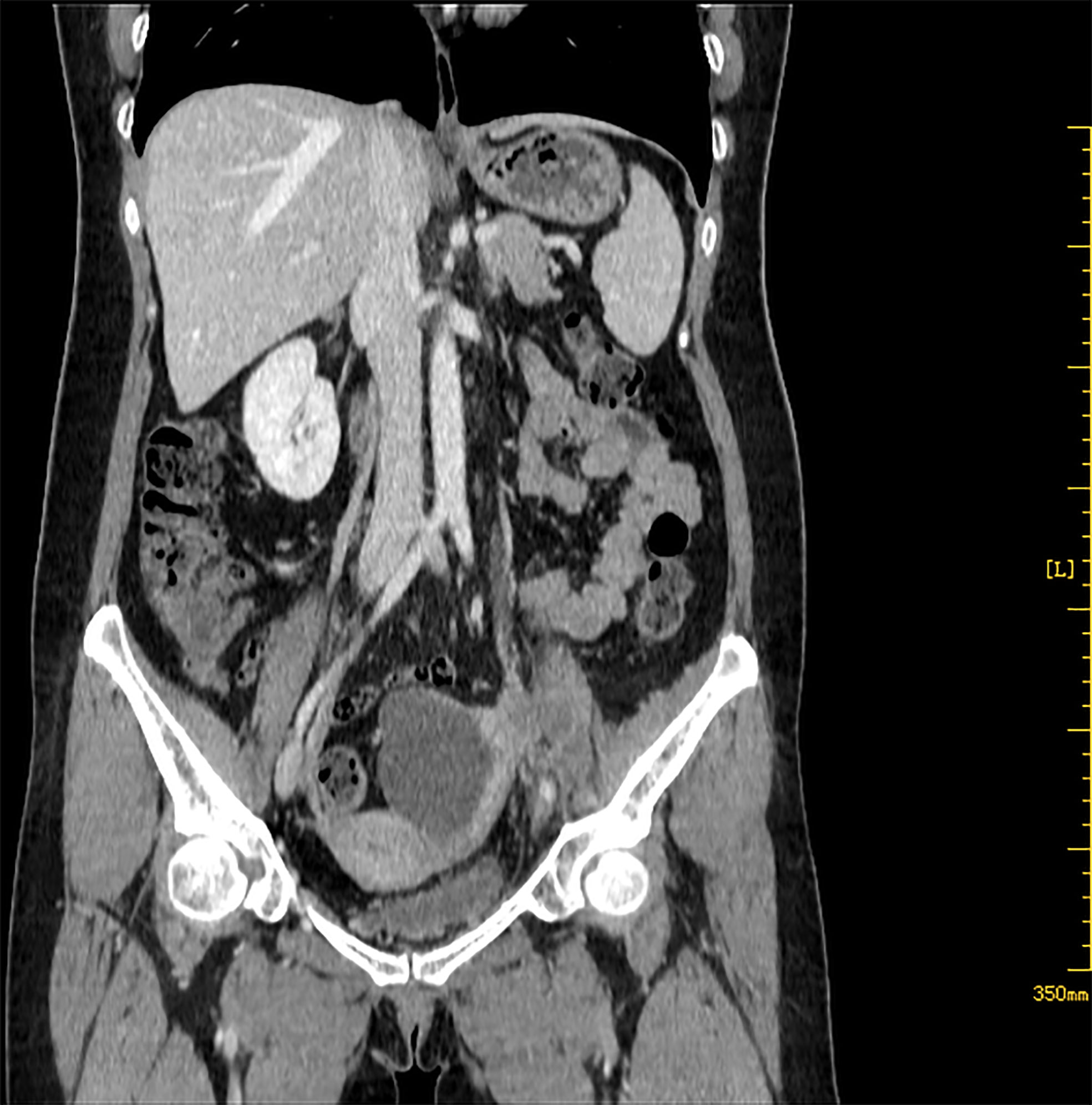
Abdominal CT. Cystic solid mass was detected on the left adnexal and the solid components were enhanced

Computed tomography (CT) scans is a diagnostic x-ray procedure that generates detailed cross-sectional images of the body, facilitating the detection of potential ovarian cancer spread to other organs. While CT scans may not effectively visualize small ovarian tumors, they have the capability to detect larger tumors and evaluate their potential invasion into nearby structures. Additionally, CT scans can identify enlarged lymph nodes, signs of cancer spreading to the liver or other organs, and indications of an ovarian tumor impacting the kidneys or bladder. Although CT scans are not commonly used for biopsying ovarian tumors, they can be utilized in the biopsy of suspected metastases through a technique known as CT-guided needle biopsy.

The difficulty in screening for SCC revolves around the creation of effective strategies with a positive predictive value. The timing aspect is crucial due to the lack of a specific timeframe for the onset of invasive disease or the interval stage between stage I and stage III carcinomas. Ultrasound screening provides a detailed view of the ovaries, identifying morphologic changes as potential signs of malignancy. Key diagnostic factors include the presence of abnormalities, ovarian size, blood flow, and abdominal/pelvic fluid. The persistence of abnormalities after four to six weeks may decrease the occurrence of false positives. Screening protocols, often based on morphologic indices, utilize transvaginal ultrasound findings like cyst wall structure, septation, papillary projections, echogenicity, and ovarian volume to effectively detect malignancy.

=== Magnetic resonance imaging ===
Although magnetic resonance (MRI) scans are not commonly employed for ovarian cancer detection, the majority of ultrasound-detected ovarian masses are usually benign. The combined approach of ultrasound with Doppler, along with the selective use of contrast-enhanced MRI, proves to be an efficient diagnostic method for identifying benign adnexal masses with distinctive features, including functional masses, dermoid, endometrioma, fibroma, pedunculated fibroid, hydrosalpinx, and peritoneal inclusion cysts. This integrated diagnostic strategy is effective in preventing unnecessary surgical intervention. Additionally, the use of MRI contributes to a decrease in false-positive diagnoses, ultimately reducing the overall number of unnecessary surgical procedures related to ovarian masses.

Advantages and limitations of using MRI to diagnose SCC:
Advantages	Limitations
1. Higher soft-tissue contrast compared to computed tomography.; 2. No radiation exposure, making it suitable for individuals with iodinated contrast agent contraindications, pregnant women, and those of childbearing age.; 3. Characterization of tissues through DCE-MRI and DWI allows a move from morphologic assessment to tumor vascularity and cellularity.; 4. Improved inter-observer agreement with the addition of DWI to the MRI protocol.; 5. DWI and DCE-MRI quantitative parameters can potentially serve as biomarkers of prognosis and response.	1. Long examination time.; 2. Technical difficulties covering a large field of view with adequate resolution.; 3. Susceptibility to patient and bowel motion.; 4. High cost and limited availability.; 5. Expertise in interpreting abdominal MRI is usually available only in specialist centers.; 6. Limitations based on the use of contrast agents or the technique itself, such as potential false-positive and false-negative results.; 7. Need for patient preparation, including fasting and the use of antiperistaltic agents, to improve examination quality.; 8. Gadolinium-based contrast agents should be used cautiously in women with renal insufficiency.; 9. Limited sensitivity for lesions smaller than 1 cm, especially in areas with similar signal intensity.; 10. Limited sensitivity and specificity for assessing lymph node metastasis based on size criteria alone.

=== Histopathology ===
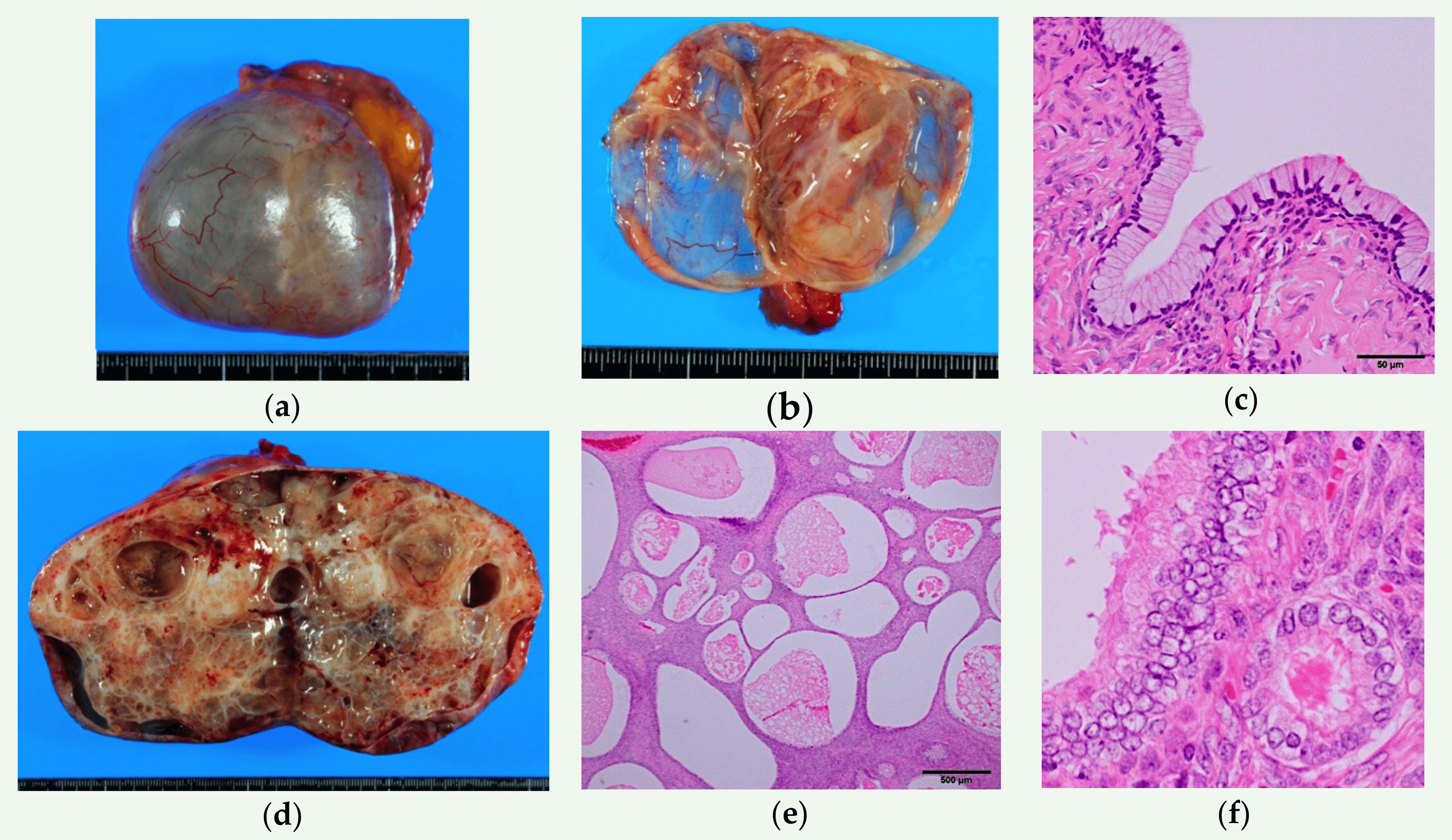
(a–c) Seromucinous cystadenoma. A thin-walled paucilocular cyst filled with thin mucinous clear fluid. The cyst wall is lined by endocervical-type columnar mucinous cells admixed with scattered ciliated cells. (d–f) Seromucinous adenofibroma. Mostly solid mass with scattered cystic spaces.

Pathologic examination of biopsies helps distinguish between benign and malignant lesions, aiding in the identification of different cancer types. Larger excisional specimens, known as resections, provide comprehensive information about the cancer, its sub classification, histologic grading, and the extent of its spread, contributing to the pathologic staging. In cases where visible growth or malignant transformation is not apparent, a precise grossing and thorough histopathological examination are essential for an accurate diagnosis. Additionally, conducting situ hybridization for HPV DNA is crucial to rule out the potential involvement of papillomavirus in this condition. To distinguish between primary ovarian serous carcinoma (OSC) and metastatic squamous cell carcinoma (SCC), various immunohistochemical markers such as PAX8, p16, WT1, ER, p53, and CK5/6 are utilized. The p53/p16 index was recognized as a valuable indicator for high-grade OSC, demonstrating diffuse p53 expression or complete absence (null type) along with diffuse p16 expression.

Additional treatment options suggest the use of targeted therapies for squamous cancers, particularly those with elevated epidermal growth factor receptor (EGFR) levels, which remains somewhat limited. Elevated EGFR expression is identified in squamous cell carcinomas of the head and neck as well as the cervix, indicating potential benefits from EGFR inhibition regardless of HPV tumor status.

== Management ==
oSCC exhibits locally invasive characteristics, with tumors demonstrating invasiveness or adherence to the adjacent uterus, pelvic structures, and colonic peritoneum, making surgery the crucial treatment. The standard approach for treating the malignant transformation of mature cystic teratoma of the ovary (MCTO) involves extensive surgery and subsequent chemotherapy, especially for advanced cases. Recommended for patients not seeking fertility, the surgical procedure includes bilateral salpingo-oophorectomy, hysterectomy, comprehensive surgical staging, and lymphadenectomy. Following surgery, advanced cases receive adjuvant chemotherapy with paclitaxel and carboplatin, although the overall prognosis is generally less favorable than that of common epithelial ovarian cancer.

=== Surgery ===
Treatment for ovarian cancer often involves surgical procedures to diagnose and remove affected tissues. The choice of surgery depends on the cancer's stage, type, and grade, offering options such as unilateral or bilateral oophorectomy, along with the removal of the fallopian tubes, uterus, and omentum. In cases of low-grade cancers, fertility preservation may be possible, but the presence of microscopic metastases introduces the need for additional surgery. Unilateral surgery is typically employed for germ cell tumors. Achieving complete cytoreduction is essential for managing advanced epithelial ovarian cancer, while debulking surgery aims to remove as much tumor as possible, enhancing the effectiveness of chemotherapy.

An alternative approach involves interval debulking surgery, which combines neoadjuvant chemotherapy with post-debulking chemotherapy. While laparoscopic surgery is suitable for early-stage cancer, advanced cases require more extensive procedures like lymphadenectomy. Secondary surgery may be an option for recurrent cases, effectiveness depending on factors such as surgical technique and the extent of the disease. Oophorectomy's primary side effect, early menopause, can be alleviated with hormone replacement therapy. Hospitals with higher surgical volumes tend to have better surgery outcomes, and the choice between laparoscopy and laparotomy for stage I ovarian cancer remains uncertain. Aggressive surgeries are associated with improved outcomes in advanced stages, despite the presence of perioperative

==== Lymphadenectomy ====
Lymphadenectomy, or the surgical removal of lymph nodes, is commonly undertaken in cancer management, with regional and radical dissections differing in the extent of node removal. A meta-analysis research of published randomized controlled trials comparing lymphadenectomy versus no lymphadenectomy in epithelial cancers of the ovary, suggest that overall survival did not demonstrate significance. However, the meta-analysis is unique for focusing on randomized trials, using hazard ratios, and treating ovarian carcinoma as a unified entity. In some cases, complications of lymphadenectomy include lymphedema, and the effectiveness of wound drainage in reducing complications after groin lymph node dissection remains uncertain.

=== Ionization, radiation and chemotherapy ===
Typically, a combination of treatments, including surgery, external beam radiotherapy, brachytherapy, and chemotherapy, is employed for these cancers. This understanding could potentially enhance control over the local region, improve quality of life, and increase survival rates. Nevertheless, there is some indication, supported by certain case series, that radiation therapy, particularly when paired with concurrent chemotherapy following aggressive cytoreduction, may be beneficial for certain cases of oSCC originating from teratomas, given the radiosensitive nature of this tumor.

There is no widely accepted chemotherapy regimen used for oSCC, both because of its heterogeneous histology and rarity, but treatment often includes a platinum-based chemotherapy drug. Reported regimens include the combination of paclitaxel and carboplatin (TC) and the combination of bleomycin, etoposide, and cisplatin (BEP).

==== Immunotherapy ====
Immunotherapy's adoption in platinum-resistant ovarian cancer remains unsupported by studies, prompting a need for further investigation. Nonetheless, evidence indicates that combining chemotherapy with the humanized anti-VEGF monoclonal antibody, bevacizumab, in the treatment of recurrent, persistent, or metastatic cervical cancer results in a 3.7-month enhancement in overall survival.

== Prognosis ==
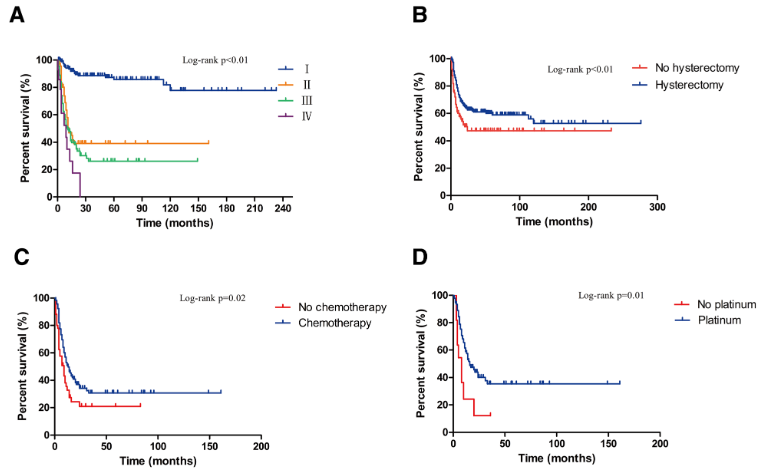
Overall survival to different treatments of patients with oSCC a. International Federation of Gynecology and Obstetrics (FIGO) stage and overall survival. b. Hysterectomy and overall survival. c. Chemotherapy and overall survival for stage II, III, IV. d. chemotherapy with platinum and overall survival for stage II, III, IV.

Ovarian squamous cell carcinoma typically presents with a mean tumor size of 14.8 cm, and overall survival does not vary based on tumor size. Clinical manifestations include abdominal pain and a palpable abdominal mass. The cancer stage is correlated with the time of diagnosis, revealing that higher stages and delayed diagnoses are associated with a worse prognosis. Hysterectomy reduces the risk of death, while lymphadenectomy does not demonstrate improved survival. Fertility-sparing surgery shows no difference in mortality compared to radical surgery in patients under 45. Adjuvant chemotherapy enhances survival in advanced stages, with platinum-based chemotherapy linked to a better prognosis. Radiotherapy and chemoradiotherapy do not improve survival.

Poor prognostic factors include age over 45 or 55, advanced staging, larger tumors, high cancer grade, absence of hysterectomy, presence of residual tumor lesions, lack of adjuvant chemotherapy, and the use of non-platinum-based chemotherapy. In cases of recurrence, secondary cytoreductive surgery may be considered, revealing efficacy in selected cases with recurrent malignant transformation of MCTO.
