= Mesomark assay =

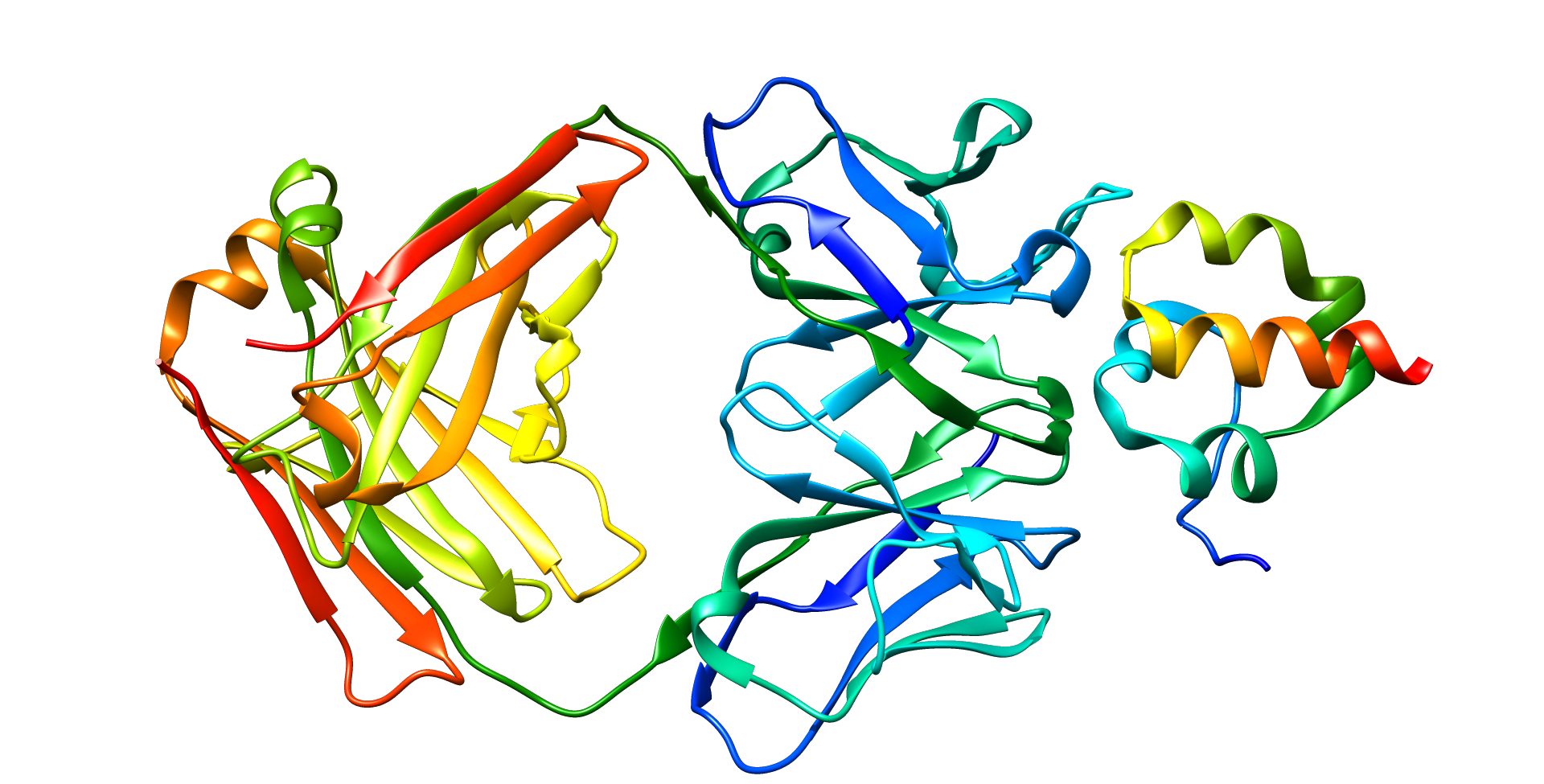
- Mesothelin protein, the protein tested for by the Mesomark assay
- Purpose: diagnose of Pleural Mesothelioma and Peritoneal Mesothelioma

The Mesomark Assay is an in vitro test to monitor and possibly diagnose pleural mesothelioma and peritoneal mesothelioma.

Developed by Fujirebio Diagnostics and approved in late January 2007 by the U.S. Food and Drug Administration (FDA), it works by measuring levels of soluble mesothelin-related proteins (SMRPs) released by diseased mesothelioma cells. The SMRP levels correlate directly with tumor volume thus permitting less invasive monitoring and improved assessment of treatment response.

The MESOMARK assay is the most well-known and the world's first blood serum-based test for diagnosing mesothelioma. However, as certain types of tumors (such as sarcomatoid mesothelioma) do not release SMRP, the FDA recommends that doctors use the MESOMARK assay in conjunction with other tests to ensure an accurate mesothelioma diagnosis.

In the future, the test may be used as an early detection measure as evidenced by recently sponsored tests by the Early Detection Research Network of the National Cancer Institute .
