= MSLN =

MSLN may refer to:

- MSLN (gene)
- Magical Girl Lyrical Nanoha, 2004 Japanese TV series, derived from Mahō Shōjo Ririkaru Nanoha
