= Lymphokine-activated killer cell =

White blood cell with immune function

In cell biology, a lymphokine-activated killer cell (also known as a LAK cell) is a white blood cell, consisting mostly of natural killer, natural killer T, and T cells that has been stimulated to kill tumor cells, but because of the function in which they activate, and the cells they can successfully target, they are classified as different than the classical natural killer and T lymphocyte systems.

== Introduction to LAK cells ==
Lymphokine-activated killer (LAK) cells are a heterogeneous cell population that consists of natural killer (NK) cells, natural killer T cells, as well as T cells. These cells are very cytotoxic against tumors when blood lymphocytes are stimulated with Interluekin-2 (IL-2) in vitro. Since NK cells the primary effector cells within these lymphokine-activated killer cells, both NK cells and LAK cells eliminate abnormal cells through the same mechanisms. However, lymphokine-activated killer cells exhibit an enhanced cytotoxicity against tumor cells, including many NK-resistant targets. Lymphokine-activated killer cells can also be cultured in much larger quantities than NK cells, allowing for effective therapies that directly lyse tumor cells in vivo. From a clinical perspective, LAK cells are especially valuable for targeting cancers that do not respond particularly well to the more conventional treatments available.

== Mechanisms of LAK Cell Cytotoxicity ==
Lymphokine-activated killer cells exhibit potent cytotoxicity against tumor cells, including NK-resistant ones, through many cytotoxic mechanisms can be further enhanced by immune factors. Dendritic cells can enhance the direct cytotoxicity of LAKs and NKs by activating both innate as well as adaptive effectors in vitro, thus maximizing anti-tumor immune responses. While dendritic cells activate lymphokine-activated killer cells via cellular activation, the iron-binding protein lactoferrin (LF) has been proven to enhance LAK and NK cell cytotoxicity via immune regulation. LF regulates immunity function through the process of selectively enhancing cytotoxic immune cells while maintaining a balanced overall immune system. The introduction of LF to lymphokine-activated killer cells continues to enhance cells’ cytotoxicity even at very low doses, which signifies the protein’s prominent role in supporting anti-tumor immunity. The lactoferrin protein supports NK and LAK cytotoxicity from infancy to adulthood. For example, since newborns normally exhibit low levels of NK activity, LF is often supplied through maternal milk, boosting antimicrobial immunity. In adults, neutrophils, a type of white blood cell, release LF to produce very similar immune effects.

It has been shown that when peripheral blood leukocytes (PBL) are cultured in the presence of Interleukin 2, it results in the development of effector cells, which are cytotoxic and are seen to localize to tumor sites and are capable of lysing fresh, non-cultured cancer cells, both primary and metastatic. LAK cells respond to these lymphokines, particularly IL-2, by developing into effector cells capable of lysing tumor cells that are known to be resistant to NK cell activity. After stimulated by IL-2, LAK cells can target and kill tumor cells in the early innate response.

The mechanism of LAK cells is distinctive from that of natural killer cell because they can lyse cells that an NK cell cannot. LAK cells are also capable of acting against cells that do not display the major histocompatibility complex, as has been shown by the ability to cause lysis in non-immunogenic, allogeneic and syngeneic tumors. LAK cells function in the same way as NK cells in the peripheral blood but are more sensitive to and can target tumor cells.

== Therapeutic Applications of LAK cells ==
Lymphokine-activated killer cells, cultured with IL-2 cytokine or other mixed effector cells in vitro, play a role in cancer immunotherapy, though this treatment can have detrimental side effects. LAK cells act as non-specific killer cells that are capable of targeting both autologous and allogeneic tumor cells. This therapy yielded encouraging results in the treatment of advanced cancers, particularly in patients that were experiencing malignant effusions due to late-stage lung cancer. A previous study demonstrated how the combination of autologous lymphokine-activated killer cells and recombinant IL-2 cleared effusions completely in 58.6% of patients as well as significantly reduced them in 36.2% of patients. Another clinical study reported an improved 7-year survival rate in patients receiving the IL-2 and LAK combination with chemotherapy or radiation, as opposed to those who just received the conventional therapy options. Though this treatment was associated with prolonged survival in a multitude of different patients, the high doses of IL-2 necessary for the treatment posed serious threats to overall health and therefore limited its clinical applicability. Interleukin-2 functions by stimulating the proliferation of LAK cells and enhancing their cytotoxic activity against tumor cells. Achieving adequate activation of LAK cells in patients who undergo this treatment often requires intensive IL-2 administration. Unfortunately, this contributes to severe side effects, including a serious condition known as capillary leak syndrome. This syndrome occurs when fluid leaks from small vessels into the surrounding tissues, leading to hypotension, oliguria, pulmonary edema, and dyspnea. As a result, clinical trials that explored the effects of this promising therapy have shown limited success. Furthermore, lymphokine-activated killer cells lack tumor specificity because they are not directly activated by tumor-associated antigens. This then prevents them from accumulating within tumor tissue, reducing their overall anti-tumor effectiveness. Due to the limitations of LAK cells, new strategies to increase tumor targeting and boost systemic delivery of these cells represent a major priority for advancing effective cancer immunotherapy.

== Recent Advances in Enhancing Anti-Tumor Activity ==
Lymphokine-activated killer cell antitumor activity can be strengthened by experimental methods such as Ad-p53 gene therapy as well as in-vitro studies of xanothohumol. While LAK cells have demonstrated tumor-killing potential in mostly laboratory animals, their effectiveness is generally not sufficient when used alone in vivo. In order to address this, researchers are investigating various combination strategies to improve the effectiveness of LAK cells in cancer therapy. The first of these studies focuses on combining LAK cell immunotherapy with gene therapy using an adenovirus engineered to deliver the p53 tumor-suppressor gene (Ad-p53). Radiation combined with the injection of Ad-p53 directly into tumors has been previously shown to be well-tolerated and effective for local tumor control. In contrast, the combination of Ad-p53 with LAK cells has the potential to work systemically, as LAK cells can target cancer cells at multiple sites. The researchers of this study aimed to determine whether head and neck squamous cell carcinoma specifically would become more susceptible to being killed by LAK cells with this therapy. As part of their experimental approach, Ad-p53 was introduced to cancer cells, causing the infected cancer cells to produce higher levels of ULBP molecules. This strengthened the signals guiding lymphokine-activated killer cells to cancer cells, boosting their cytotoxicity and enabling them to become much more aggressive toward the cancerous tissue.

In a separate approach, researchers evaluated the effects of xanothohumol on LAK cells in vitro. Xanothohumol, a natural compound from hops, was proven to be effective in inhibiting cell proliferation and migration of non-small cell lung cancer in vitro while suppressing tumor growth in vivo. This outcome is due to xanthohumol directly inactivating the T-lymphokine activated killer cell-originated protein kinase (TOPK), a protein that plays a role in promoting tumor growth, invasion, and metastasis. By suppressing TOPK, xanothohumol allows for cancer cells to become more vulnerable to an immune attack, which in turn enhances the cytotoxic activity of LAK cells against tumor cells. Studies also depict how xanothohumol can directly bind to T-lymphokine-activated killer cell-originated protein kinase, revealing the mechanism by which it inactivates the protein. This discovery identifies TOPK as a primary target for xanothohumol and exemplifies how inhibiting this protein can strengthen the cytotoxic activity as LAK cells. The findings from this recent study ultimately suggest that merging xanothohumol with lymphokine-activated killer cell-based immunotherapy could potentially provide an even more effective approach to targeting resistant tumors.

The use of LAK cells has been found to be helpful in treating human cells with different cancers in vitro. LAK cell therapy is a method that uses interleukin 2 (IL-2) to enhance the number of lymphocytes in an in vitro setting, and it has formed the foundation of many immunotherapy assays that are now in use. LAK cells have shown potential as a cellular agent for cancer therapy and have been utilized therapeutically in association with IL-2 for the treatment of various cancers. LAK cells have anticancer efficacy against homologous carcinoma cells and can grow ex vivo in the presence of IL-2. In melanoma and gastric cancer cells, intercellular adhesion molecule 1 (ICAM-1) antibody can significantly inhibit in vitro LAK-induced lysis of cancer cells. A study has shown that ICAM1 in lung cancer cells increases LAK cell-mediated tumor cell death as a new anti-tumor mechanism. One study uses a 4 hour chromium release assay, which is an assay used to measure the cytotoxicity of T cells and natural killer cells, to measure lysis of the fresh solid tumor cells from 10 cancer patients and found that in all 10 cancer patients the fresh autologous tumor cells were resistant to lysis by PBL with natural killer cells, but were lysed by the LAK cells.

== Treatment Possible Side Effects ==
LAK cells, along with the administration of IL-2 have been experimentally used to treat cancer in mice and humans, but there is very high toxicity with this treatment - Severe fluid retention was the major side effect of therapy, although all side effects resolved after interleukin-2 administration was stopped. Treatment of IL-2 cells by themselves to treat cancers are more dangerous than treatment with the combination of IL-2 and LAK cells.
