= Urogenital peritoneum =

Membrane of the abdomen

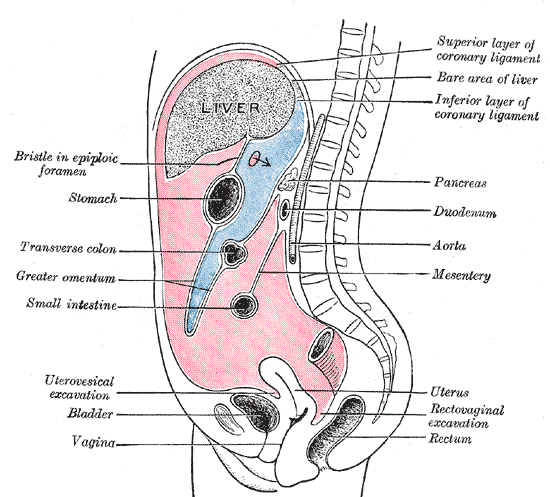
- The epiploic foramen, greater sac or general cavity (red) and lesser sac, or omental bursa (blue).

Details

Identifiers
- Latin: peritoneum urogenitale
- TA98: A10.1.02.501
- TA2: 3738
- FMA: 77428

Urogenital peritoneum is a portion of the posterior abdominal peritoneum that is found below the linea terminalis.

It includes the broad ligament of uterus.
