= P53 p63 p73 family =

Family of tumor suppressor genes

The p53 p63 p73 family is a family of tumor suppressor genes.

This gene family encodes the proteins:

- p53 (encoded by the human TP53 gene)
- p63 (encoded by the human TP63 gene)
- p73 (encoded by the human TP73 gene)

They are sometimes considered part of a "p53 family." When overexpressed, these proteins are known to be involved in tumor pathogenesis.

== Evolution ==
p53, p63, and p73 have similar features in their gene structures and functions but have also diverged evolutionarily. The p53 family evolved from an ancestor gene in unicellular life. The ancestor gene functioned in germ line DNA protection early invertebrates. In invertebrates, the ancestor gene resembled p63/p73 as it contained the sterile alpha motif (SAM) domain. p53 diverged from p63/p73 with a gene duplication in the cartilaginous fish. p63 and p73 differentiated from each other in bony fish. In vertebrates, p53 began the role of protecting the somatic cells and acting as a tumor suppressor.
