= Mesothelin =

Protein found in humans

MSLN
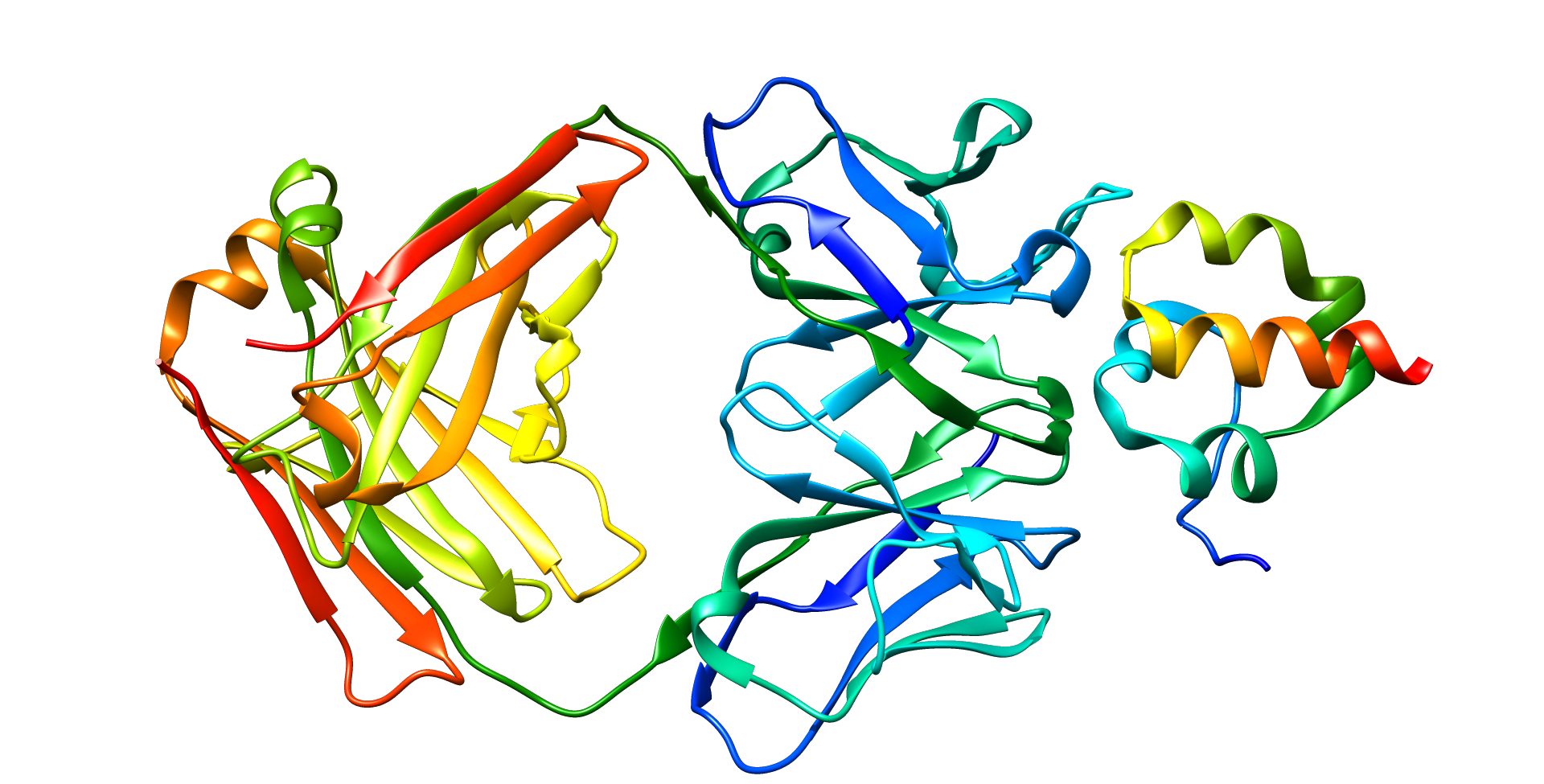

Identifiers
- Aliases: MSLN, MPF, SMRP, mesothelin
- External IDs: OMIM: 601051; MGI: 1888992; GeneCards: MSLN
Available structures
PDB	Ortholog search: PDBe RCSB
PDB	List of PDB id codes 4F3F

Gene location (Human)
Chr.	Chromosome 16 (human)
Band	16p13.3	Start	760,734 bp
Band	16p13.3	End	768,865 bp

Gene location (Mouse)
Chr.	Chromosome 17 (mouse)
Band	17|17 A3.3	Start	25,967,587 bp
Band	17|17 A3.3	End	25,973,352 bp
RNA expression pattern
Bgee	Human / Mouse (ortholog); Top expressed in: right uterine tube; olfactory zone of nasal mucosa; right lung; upper lobe of left lung; germinal epithelium; palpebral conjunctiva; nasal epithelium; pericardium; mucosa of paranasal sinus; trachea / Top expressed in: left lung lobe; umbilical cord; pericardial cavity; trachea; decidua; atrioventricular valve; endothelial cell of lymphatic vessel; fundus of urinary bladder; olfactory epithelium; sciatic nerve; More reference expression data
BioGPS	n/a
Gene ontology
Molecular function	protein binding
Cellular component	cell surface; anchored component of membrane; Golgi apparatus; membrane; extracellular region; extracellular space; plasma membrane; endoplasmic reticulum lumen
Biological process	pancreas development; cell adhesion; cell-matrix adhesion; post-translational protein modification
Sources:Amigo / QuickGO
Orthologs
Databases	NCBI: entry; OMA: entry
Species	Human	Mouse
Entrez	10232	56047
Ensembl	ENSG00000102854	ENSMUSG00000063011
UniProt	Q13421	Q61468
RefSeq (mRNA)	NM_001177355; NM_005823; NM_013404	NM_018857; NM_001356286; NM_001374653
RefSeq (protein)	NP_001170826; NP_005814; NP_037536	NP_061345; NP_001343215
Location (UCSC)	Chr 16: 0.76 – 0.77 Mb	Chr 17: 25.97 – 25.97 Mb
PubMed search
- Wikidata
View/Edit Human	View/Edit Mouse

Mesothelin, also known as MSLN, is a protein that in humans is encoded by the MSLN gene.

== Function ==
Mesothelin is a 40 kDa protein that is expressed in mesothelial cells. The protein was first identified by its reactivity with monoclonal antibody K1. Subsequent cloning studies showed that the mesothelin gene encodes a precursor protein that is processed to yield mesothelin which is attached to the cell membrane by a glycophosphatidylinositol linkage and a 31-kDa shed fragment named megakaryocyte-potentiating factor (MPF). Although it has been proposed that mesothelin may be involved in cell adhesion, its biological function is not known. A knockout mouse line that lacks mesothelin reproduces and develops normally.

Mesothelin is over expressed in several human tumors, including mesothelioma, ovarian cancer, pancreatic adenocarcinoma, lung adenocarcinoma, and cholangiocarcinoma. Mesothelin binds MUC16 (also known as CA125), indicating that the interaction of mesothelin and MUC16 may contribute to the implantation and peritoneal spread of tumors by cell adhesion. The region (residues 296-359) consisting of 64 amino acids at the N-terminus of cell surface mesothelin has been identified as the functional binding domain (named IAB) for MUC16/CA125, suggesting the mechanism of mesothelin acting as a MUC16/CA125 functional partner in cancer development.

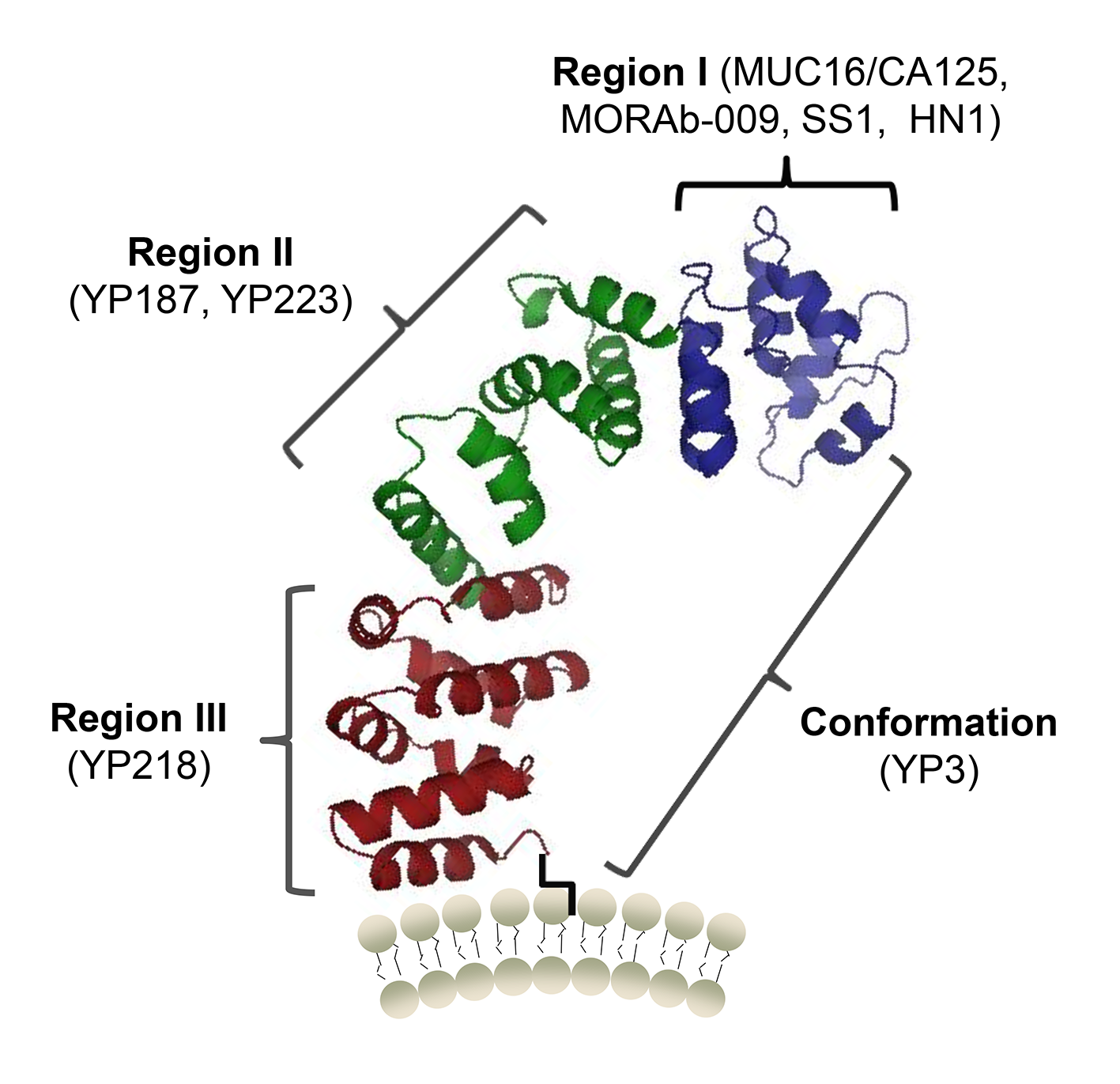
A protein structure model of human mesothelin and the binding sites of MUC16 (CA125) and antibodies

== Medical applications ==
Mesothelin is a tumor differentiation antigen that is normally present on the mesothelial cells lining the pleura, peritoneum and pericardium. Since mesothelin is overexpressed in several cancers and is immunogenic, the protein could be exploited as tumor marker or as the antigenic target of a therapeutic cancer vaccine. A 2016 review indicates that some immunotherapeutic strategies have shown encouraging results in early-phase clinical trials. Elevations of serum mesothelin specific to ovarian and other cancer patients may be measured using ELISA assays. Soluble mesothelin is identified as the extracellular domain of membrane-bound mesothelin shed from tumor cells according to the mass spectrometry analysis of soluble mesothelin purified from cell culture supernatant.

Assays for blood-borne mesothelin and MPF for tumor diagnosis, especially applied to asbestos-related mesothelioma have been developed. Elevated serum mesothelin was found in most patients with mesothelioma (71%) and ovarian cancer (67%). Blood MPF and mesothelin levels were correlated, with modest accuracy for malignant pleural mesothelioma and lung cancer (sensitivity 74% and 59%, specificity 90% and 86%, respectively for MPF and mesothelin assays). Circulating mesothelin is reported in nearly all pancreatic cancers, however the levels in healthy persons often exceed 80 ng/mL (using 40 kD molecular weight as the conversion factor) and to widely overlap the values in the pancreatic cancer patients. It was noted that the cutoff levels for normal could differ as much as 10-fold among publications, depending on the assay used and thus that normal levels must be determined anew when new assays are introduced. Increase of mesothelin-specific antibodies were also detected in the sera of about 40% of patients with mesothelioma and 42% with ovarian cancer, indicating an antibody response to mesothelin was correlated with high expression of mesothelin on tumor cells.

Human monoclonal antibodies HN1 and SD1 targeting mesothelin have been isolated by phage display. Mitchell Ho and Ira Pastan at the U.S. National Institutes of Health (NIH) generated rabbit monoclonal antibodies targeting rare and poorly immunogenic epitopes of mesothelin, including the C terminus recognized by the YP218 antibody. The rabbit antibodies have been "humanized" by Ho and Zhang using human immunoglobulin germline framework sequences for CDR grafting based on computational structure modeling. The CAR-T cells derived from the humanized YP218 antibody (hYP218) effectively inhibit the growth of human xenograft tumors in mice.
