= Necrotizing periodontal diseases =

Bacterial infection of the oral mucosa and periodontium

- Other names: NPD
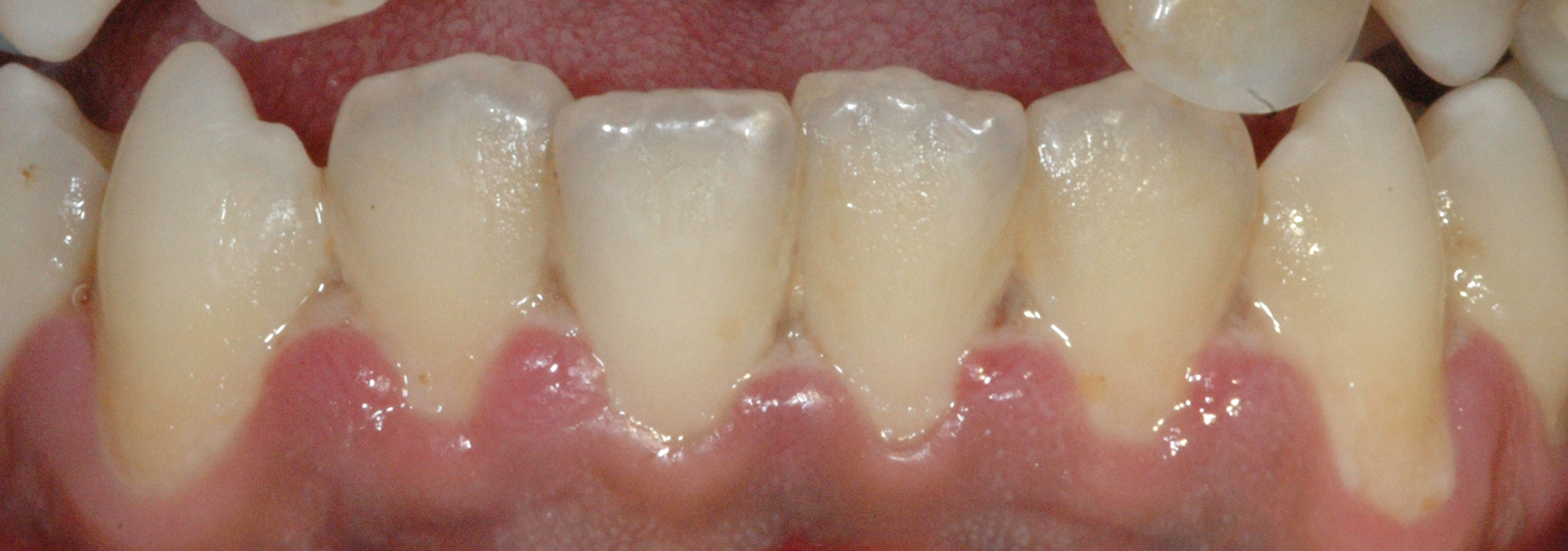
- A fairly mild presentation of necrotizing gingivitis at the typical site on the gums of the anterior mandibular teeth
- Specialty: Periodontology
- Symptoms: pain, bad breath, fever, bleeding gums, malaise
- Complications: Progression
- Types: Necrotizing gingivitis, Necrotizing periodontitis, Necrotizing stomatitis
- Causes: Bacterial infection by Prevotella intermedia, Treponema, Selenomonas, Fusobacterium spp, Spirochetes and compromised host immune response
- Risk factors: HIV/AIDS, malnutrition, psychological stress, sleep deprivation, inadequate oral hygiene, pre-existing gingivitis, history of necrotizing periodontal disease, tobacco and alcohol use, youth, Caucasian ethnicity, orthodontics
- Diagnostic method: Based on clinical findings (necrosis, ulcer of interdental papilla; gingival bleeding, pain, pseudomembrane formation, halitosis)
- Differential diagnosis: herpetic gingivostomatitis, mucous membrane pemphigoid, pemphigus vulgaris, toothbrush abrasion, clinical attachment loss and alveolar bone loss (in NP, NS)
- Prevention: oral hygiene
- Treatment: debridement (dental), metronidazole

Necrotizing periodontal diseases is one of the three categories of periodontitis as defined by the American Academy of Periodontology/European Federation of Periodontology 2017 World Workshop classification system.

Necrotizing periodontal diseases are a type of inflammatory periodontal (gum) disease caused by bacteria (notably fusobacteria and spirochaete species). The diseases appear to represent different severities or stages of the same disease process, although this is not completely certain. These diseases usually have a sudden onset. The mildest on the spectrum is necrotizing gingivitis (NG), followed by the successively more severe conditions necrotizing periodontitis (NP), necrotizing stomatitis and finally cancrum oris (noma), which is frequently fatal.

== Necrotizing gingivitis ==
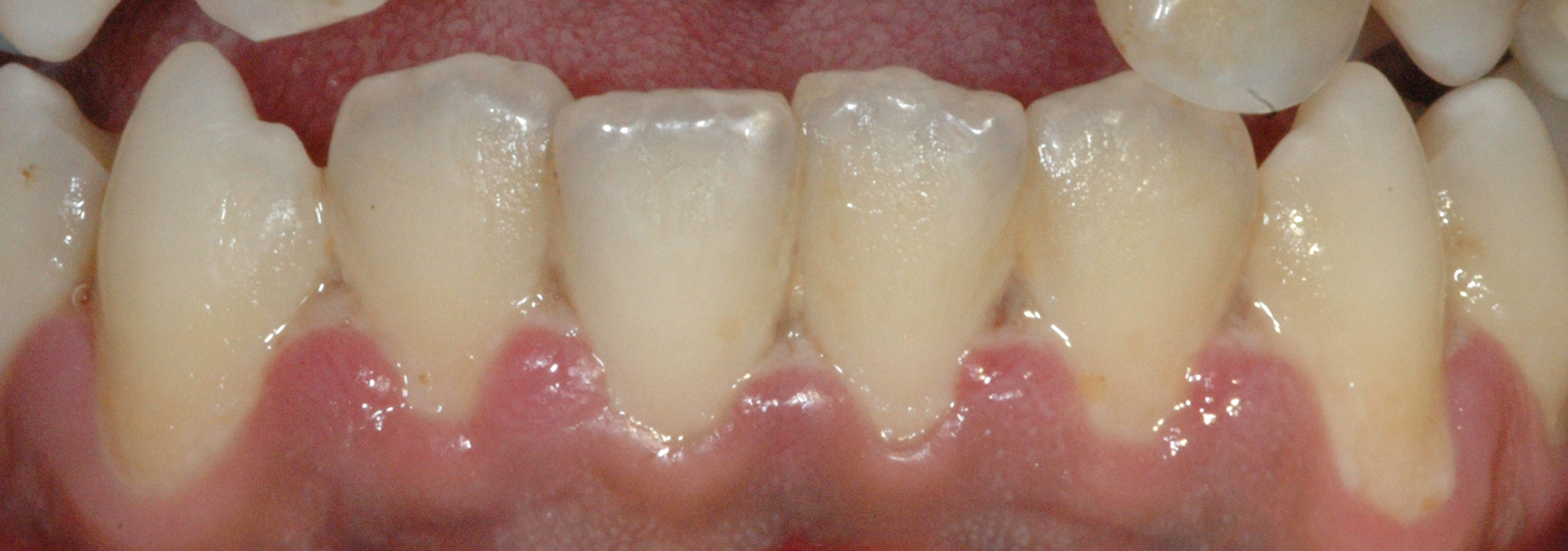
Necrotizing gingivitis: painful, bleeding, sloughing ulceration and loss of the interdental papillae (usually of the lower front teeth)

Necrotizing gingivitis, is a common, non-contagious infection of the gums. If improperly treated necrotizing may become chronic and/or recurrent. In developed countries, necrotizing gingivitis occurs mostly in young adults with predisposing factors such as psychological stress, sleep deprivation, poor oral hygiene, smoking, immunosuppression and/or malnutrition. In developing countries, necrotizing gingivitis occurs mostly in malnourished children. Due to shared predisposing factors in a population (e.g. students during a period of examinations, armed forces recruits) necrotizing gingivitis is known to occur in epidemic-type patterns. This has led to the popular belief that necrotizing gingivitis is contagious, but this is not the case. The main features of necrotizing gingivitis are painful, bleeding gums and ulceration and necrosis of the interdental papilla. There may also be intra-oral halitosis, cervical lymphadenitis (swollen lymph nodes in the neck) and malaise. Treatment of the acute disease is by debridement and antibiotics, usually metronidazole. Poor oral hygiene and other predisposing factors may need to be corrected to prevent recurrence. Necrotizing gingivitis is also known as trench mouth, as it was observed to occur in the mouths of front line soldiers during World War I.

== Necrotizing periodontitis ==
Necrotizing periodontitis (NP) is where the infection leads to attachment loss (destruction of the ligaments anchoring teeth in their sockets), but involves only the gingiva, periodontal ligament and alveolar ligament. If attachment loss is present in the disease, it is termed NP, unless the disease has progressed beyond the mucogingival junction. NP may be an extension of NG into the periodontal ligaments, although this is not completely proven. In the meantime, NG, NP, and NS are classified together under the term necrotizing periodontal diseases.

== Necrotizing stomatitis ==
Progression of NP into tissue beyond the mucogingival junction characterizes necrotizing stomatitis. Atypical case reports describe NS development without prior NPD lesions.

== Noma ==
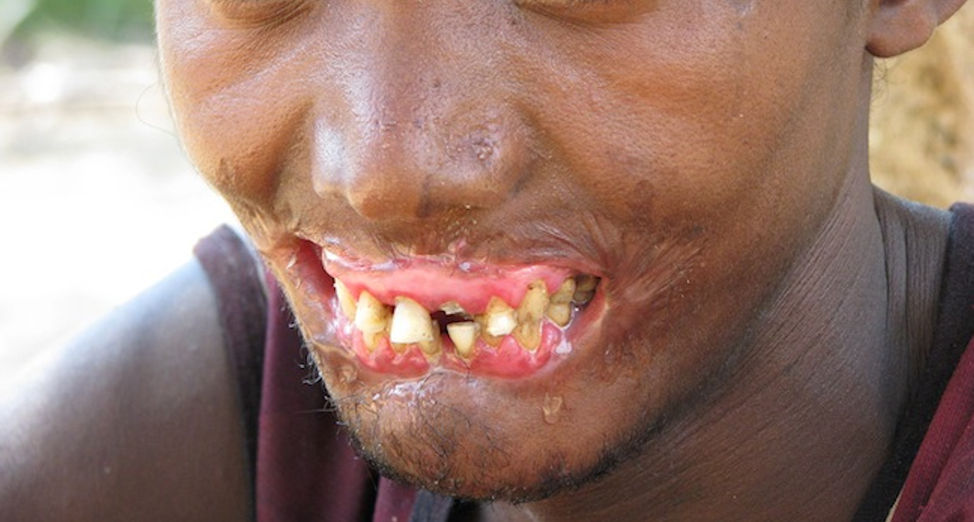
Noma in an adult male. Note destruction of orofacial tissues.

Noma (also termed cancrum oris) is a necrotizing and destructive infection of the mouth and face, and therefore not strictly speaking a periodontal disease. In modern times, this condition usually occurs in malnourished children in developing countries. It may be disfiguring and is frequently fatal. It has been suggested that all cases of noma develop from pre-existing NG, but this is not confirmed. Furthermore, the vast majority of cases of NG and NP will not progress to the more severe forms, even without treatment.

== Vincent's angina ==
Strictly speaking, Vincent's angina is not a necrotizing periodontal disease. However, Vincent's angina is widely confused with necrotizing gingivitis (previously also called "Vincent's gingivitis"). Vincent's angina is tonsillitis and pharyngitis, and does not typically involve the gums. Many publications using the term "Vincent's angina" date from the twentieth century, and the term is not so common in modern times. The condition is named after Jean Hyacinthe Vincent, a French physician who was working at the Paris Pasteur Institute. Vincent described a fusospirochetal infection of the pharynx and palatine tonsils, causing "ulcero-membranous pharyngitis and tonsillitis", which later became known as Vincent's angina. Later in 1904, Vincent described the same pathogenic organisms in "ulceronecrotic gingivitis".

== Nomenclature ==
The necrotizing periodontal diseases used to include the words "acute" and "ulcerative" in their names (e.g., "necrotizing ulcerative gingivitis"). Neither term is included in the AAP/EFP 2017 World Workshop classification on Necrotizing Periodontal Diseases.
