= Hugo Carl Plaut =

German physician

Prof Hugo Carl Plaut
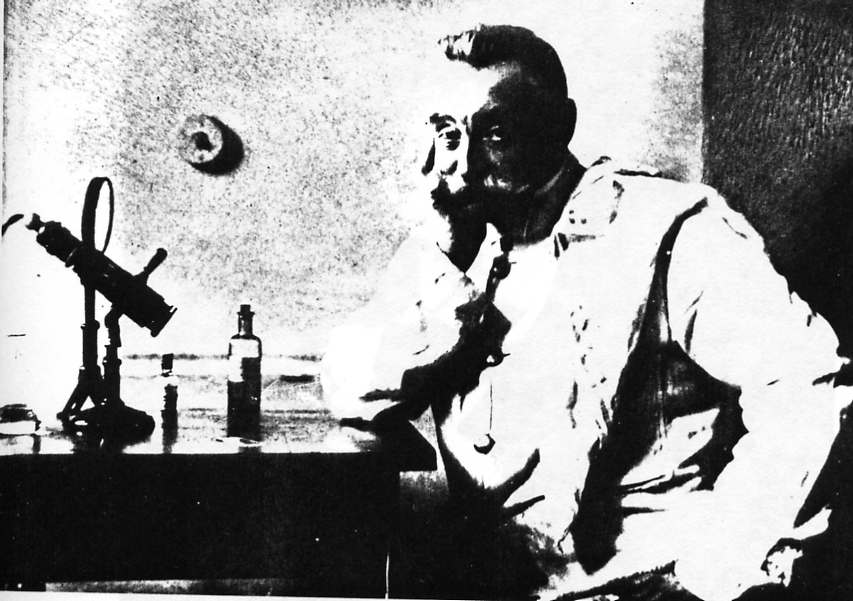
- Prof Plaut in his laboratory 1920
- Born: 12 October 1858; Leipzig
- Died: 17 February 1928 (aged 69); Hamburg
- Education: University of Leipzig
- Occupation: Medical research Physician Veterinary physician
- Known for: Plaut-Vincent angina
- Spouse: Adele née Brach (1867-1953)
- Children: Hubert, Theo, Carrie, Rahel

Hugo Carl Plaut (12 October 1858 – 17 February 1928) was a German physician, who worked primarily as a bacteriologist and mycologist in human and animal medicine. He is best known for his discovery of the cause of Plaut–Vincent angina an infection of the tonsils caused by spirochaeta and treponema bacteria. He was also a pioneer in the field of vaccination and he created a vaccine for sheep pox.

== Life ==
He was born in Leipzig, the son of the banker Gustav Plaut and his wife Bertha, née Oppenheimer. His school was the humanistic Thomas School in Leipzig. After leaving school he studied veterinary medicine and medicine at the University of Leipzig and the University of Jena. He received his doctorate with a dissertation titled "The organised contagium of sheeppox (variola ovina in Latin) and the mitigation thereof in Toussaint's manner" (see note about Toussaint and Pasteur). He made contributions to the aetiology of the poxviridae family of viruses through his work using the method of Toussaint to produce attenuated vaccine that was therapeutically active against sheepox. His work was under the supervision of his mentor, Friedrich Anton Zürn (1835-1900), who was professor emeritus of veterinarian sciences at Leipzig University. In 1888 he married and moved to Hamburg, where he published papers and established laboratories firstly at his home in Eppendorf and later at his residence in central Hamburg street at Neue Rabenstrasse 21. From 1888 he probably had some connection with Eppendorf Hospital but had to wait until the appointment of Ludolph Brauer (1865-1951) as director of the hospital to have a small research institute of his own.

In 1896 he described a special form of tonsillitis, now called Plaut–Vincent angina, two years later Vincent of the Pasteur Institute described the same condition. It became known as Vincent’s angina in the English-speaking world probably as a reflection of anti-German feelings after World War I. Both names are in current use. In addition, he worked on microbial research of Streptococcus mucous, Streptothrix and Actinomyces and he continued his research in veterinary medicine. In 1888 he became founding director of a small Institute for Mircrobiological Research at what is now the University Medical Center Hamburg-Eppendorf (UKE). After the 1st World War he taught ex-servicemen at the nascent University of Hamburg. It became a full university in 1919 and he was honoured with the title of Extraordinary Professor. Before he died he left instructions to his cleaner Frau Lemke to safely destroy his microbial cultures including possibly cholera cultures. In his honour, the Hugo Carl Plaut Medal is awarded annually to botanists, doctors and scientists.

== Family ==
He married Adele née Brach (1867-1953) in 1888. Their daughters Carrie (1892-1976) and Rahel Plaut (1894-1993) both became doctors, the latter was married to the historian Hans Liebeschuetz. Hubert Plaut became a mathematician. and Theo Plaut an economist.

== Publications ==
- Die Hyphenpilze oder Eumyceten (1903, 19132) - Mycology
- Dermatomykosen - Fungal skin infections (1909) - Dermatomycoses
- Mykosen - Mycoses (1919)
- Eumycetes (1913) - a division of fungi that includes all true fungi (as the ascomycetes and basidiomycetes) as distinguished from the slime molds

== Note ==
Toussaint’s most significant contribution was the development of a vaccine against anthrax. He attenuated the live virus with an antiseptic, carbonic acid whereas Pasteur used potassium dichromate to attenuate anthrax. Pasteur based his method on Toussaint’s but did not give him credit.
