= Liebeschuetz =

Liebeschuetz or Liebeschütz is a German surname. Notable people with the surname include:

- Hans Liebeschuetz (1893–1978), German historian
- Wolf Liebeschuetz (1927–2022), British historian, son of Hans
