= Prevotella intermedia =

Scientific classification
- Domain: Bacteria
- Kingdom: Pseudomonadati
- Phylum: Bacteroidota
- Class: Bacteroidia
- Order: Bacteroidales
- Family: Prevotellaceae
- Genus: Prevotella
- Species: P. intermedia

Binomial name
- Prevotella intermedia (Holdeman and Moore 1970) Shah and Collins 1990

Species of bacterium

Prevotella intermedia (formerly Bacteroides intermedius) is a gram-negative, obligate anaerobic pathogenic bacterium involved in periodontal infections, including gingivitis and periodontitis, and often found in acute necrotizing ulcerative gingivitis. It is commonly isolated from dental abscesses, where obligate anaerobes predominate.

Prevotella intermedia is thought to be more prevalent in patients with noma.

Prevotella intermedia use steroid hormones as growth factors, so their numbers are higher in pregnant women. It has also been isolated from women with bacterial vaginosis.

== See also ==
- Oral microbiology
- List of bacterial vaginosis microbiota
