= Notifiable diseases in Canada =

The notifiable diseases in Canada at present are as follows:

Disease	Years notifiable
Acute flaccid paralysis (AFP)	2000–present
AIDS	1986–present
Anaplasmosis	2024–present
Anthrax	1930–1982, 2002–present
Babesiosis	2024–present
Botulism	1933–present
Brucellosis	1928–present
Campylobacteriosis	1986–present
Chickenpox (varicella)	1924–1958, 1986–present
Chlamydia	1991–present
Cholera	1930–present
Clostridioides difficile associated diarrhea (CDI)	2009–present
Congenital rubella syndrome (CRS)	1979–present
Congenital syphilis	1993–present
Creutzfeldt-Jakob disease (CJD)	2000–present
Cryptosporidiosis	2000–present
Cyclosporiasis	2000–present
Diphtheria	1924–present
Giardiasis	1983–present
Gonorrhea	1924–present
Group B streptococcal disease of the newborn (GBS)	2000–present
Hantavirus pulmonary syndrome	2000–present
Hepatitis A	1927–1958, 1969–present
Hepatitis B	1969–present
Hepatitis C	1991–present
HIV Infection	2000–present
Influenza, laboratory confirmed	2000–present
Invasive Group A streptococcal disease	2000–present
Invasive Haemophilus influenzae, non-b disease	2007–present
Invasive Haemophilus influenzae, type b disease	1986–present
Invasive Meningococcal disease	1924–present
Invasive Pneumococcal disease	2000–present
Legionellosis	1986–present
Leprosy	1925–present
Listeriosis	1990–1999, 2007–present
Lyme disease	2009–present
Malaria	1929–1978, 1983–present
Measles	1924–1958, 1969–present
Monkeypox (Mpox)	2024–present
Mumps	1924–1958, 1986–present
Norovirus infection	2007–present
Paralytic shellfish poisoning	2007–present
Pertussis	1924–present
Plague	1930–present
Poliomyelitis	1924–present
Powassan Virus Disease	2024–present
Rabies	1927–present
Rubella	1924–1958, 1969–present
Salmonellosis	1959–present
SARS	2004–present
Shigellosis	1924–present
Smallpox	1924–1981, 2002–present
Syphilis	1924–present
Tetanus	1957–present
Tuberculosis	1924–present
Tularemia	1930–1982, 2002–present
Typhoid	1924–1952, 1969–present
Verotoxigenic Escherichia coli infection	1991–present
Viral hemorrhagic fever	1979–1982, 2002–present
West Nile virus infection (WNV)	2003–present
Yellow Fever	1930–present

== Past notifiable diseases ==
Disease	Years notifiable
Actinomycosis	1930–1958, 1969–1999
Amoebiasis	1924–1999
Cancer	1931–1959
Chancroid	1943–1968, 1979–1983
Conjunctivitis	1925–1959
Encephalitis	1924–1986
Epidemic diarrhea of the newborn	1959–1978
Erysipelas	1930–1958
Food poisoning	1959–1981
Glanders	1931–1958
Influenza, epidemic	1924–1958
Louse-borne relapsing fever	1959–1978
Meningitis, bacterial	1979–1999
Meningitis, viral	1963–1999
Paratyphoid	1924–1999
Pellagra	1930–1942
Pemphigus neonatorum	1959–1969
Pneumonia	1930–1944
Psittacosis	1930–1982
Puerperal septicaemia	1924–1959
Q Fever	1959–1978
Rickettsial infections	1959–1978
Rocky Mountain spotted fever	1930–1978
Scarlet fever	1924–1978
Septic sore throat	1924–1978
Tick paralysis	1930–1956
Trachoma	1930–1958
Trichinosis	1929–1999
Typhus	1929–1978
Vincent's angina	1927–1958
