= Approximal =

In dentistry, the approximal surfaces are those surfaces which form points of contact between adjacent teeth. However, in diastematic individuals these surfaces may not make contact but are still considered approximal. Due to the topography of approximal sites the removal of plaque by brushing may be difficult and hence a significant build-up may occur increasing the risk of plaque-related diseases such as dental caries or gingivitis, therefore dental flossing is recommended.
