= Rahel Plaut =

British doctor and researcher (1894–1993)

Dr Rahel Plaut
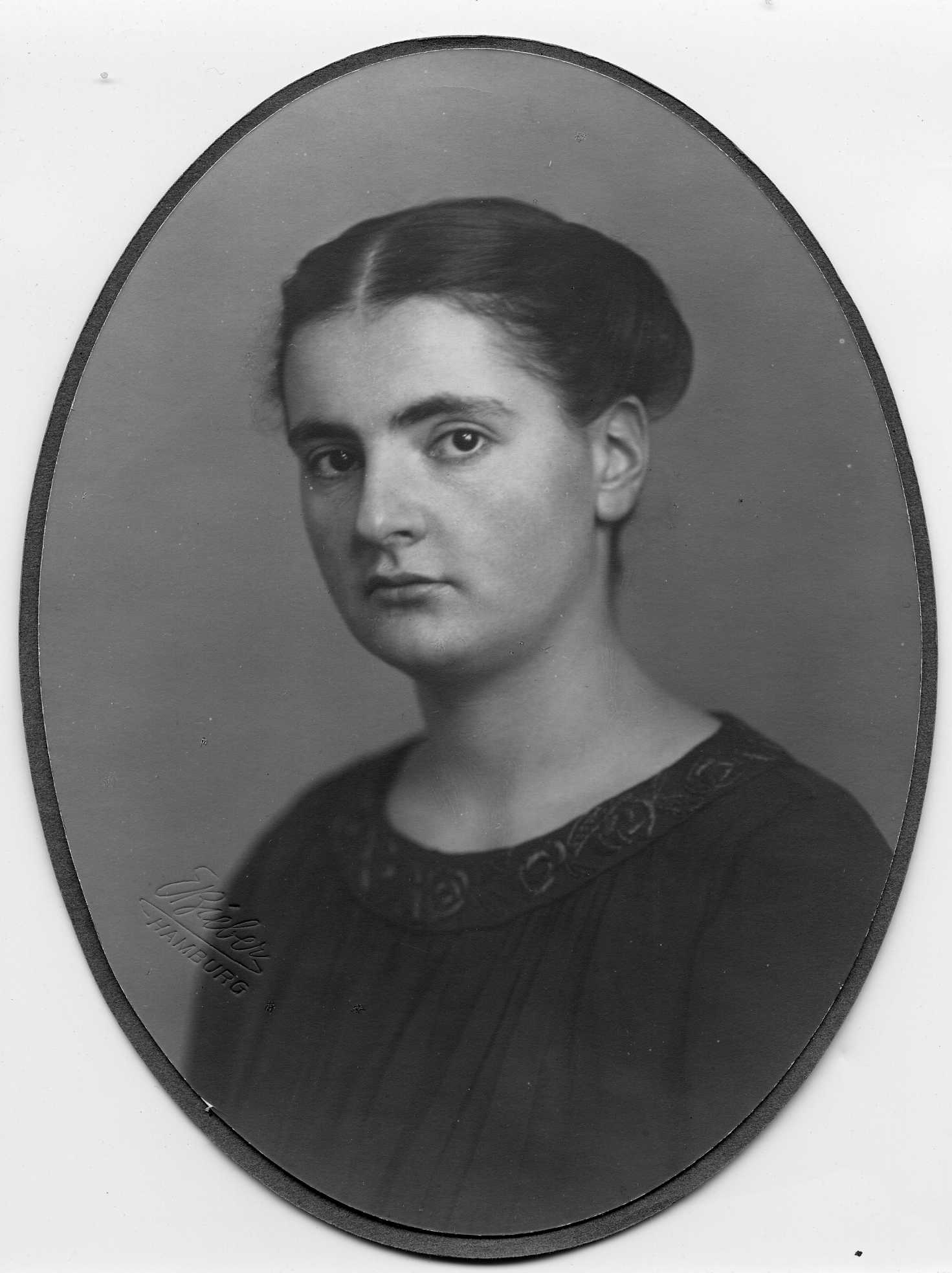
- Born: Elisabeth Amalie Rahel Plaut; June 21, 1894; Leipzig
- Died: 22 December 1993 (aged 99); Rochester, Kent, England
- Education: University of Freiburg
- Occupations: Researcher & doctor
- Known for: First female academic Hamburg Medical School
- Spouse: Hans Liebeschuetz
- Children: Wolf, Hugo, Elisabeth

Dr Rahel Plaut (1894-1993) was a medical doctor and researcher in physiology who became the first female academic to be appointed at Hamburg University School of Medicine. Between 1919 and 1924 she co-authored 25 scientific papers on subjects including metabolism, muscle physiology and infectious disease. She married the historian Hans Liebeschuetz (German: Liebeschütz) in Hamburg in 1924. They emigrated to England in 1938 to escape Nazi persecution.

== Early life and education ==
Born in Leipzig in 1894 Elisabeth Amalie Rahel Liebeschuetz née Plaut was one of four children of the bacteriologist Hugo Carl Plaut and his wife Adele née Brach. The family moved to Hamburg in 1898 when her father became director of the Institute for Mycological Research at what was to become in 1919 Hamburg University Hospital in Eppendorf. From 1913 she studied zoology, then medicine at the University of Freiburg After further study in Kiel and Bonn she graduated in 1918 with a first class degree (summa cum laude). Her PhD was in pathological anatomy under Hugo Ribbert. Her work included a 1918 description of the pathology of breast cysts.

== Career and research ==
She then moved back to Hamburg where in 1919 she was appointed assistant at Institute of Physiology at the University Hospital in Eppendorf under the direction of Otto Kestner. In 1923 she became a full lecturer and researcher on human physiology.

On 24 July 1924, aged thirty, she married the historian Hans Liebeschuetz. Since employees who were financially independent in 1923 were dismissed, she had to give up her post after marriage. From then on she taught unpaid until 1933 at the Physiological Institute and also from home in Neue Rabenstrasse to students of dietetics. In addition, she published 25 papers from 1919 to 1925 on a variety of topics including: altitude physiology, muscle physiology, microbiology, respiratory physiology, metabolism, and thermoregulation .

== Emigration to England ==
Since she was considered a "non- aryan" under the Law for the Restoration of the Professional Civil Service, a law passed by the National Socialist regime on 7 April 1933, two months after Adolf Hitler attained power. Under this law the Hamburg Senate withdrew her teaching licence in July 1933. She then taught at a Jewish home economics school and at the Hamburg Israelite Hospital. In 1936 she visited England to see her brother Theo Plaut, living in Hull, and explored the possibility of sending her children to school there. In December 1938, the couple moved to England to escape persecution. Due to lack of recognition of her professional qualifications she could not practice in the UK at that time. The onset of war in 1939 meant an increased demand for doctors and she could have practised, though she chose to look after her young family of three children, Wolf Liebeschuetz (born 1927), Hugo (born 1929) and Elisabeth (born 1932). Later she worked for the Royal Voluntary Service, a charity as well as writing about and studying her family's history.

== Literature ==
- Doris Fischer-Radizi: Vertreiben aus Hamburg. Die Ärztin Rahel Liebeschütz-Plaut. (= Wissenschaftler in Hamburg. 2). Wallstein, Göttingen 2019, ISBN 978-3-8353-3383-3.
- Rudolph und Friederike Brach, Vom Rio Grande an die Elbe, Wallstein Verlag, 2023, Gottingen, ISBN 978-3-8353-5309-1 (about her grandfather)
