= Facing Africa =

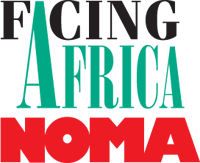
- Type: UK registered charity
- Purpose: Surgical outreach
- Founder: Chris Lawrence
- Headquarters: Wiltshire, UK
- Trustees: Chris Lawrence, Angus Mack, Teresa Lawrence, David Dunaway, Gary Williams.
- Website: facingafrica.org

Facing Africa is a British registered charity providing funds for the visits of teams of voluntary surgeons from the UK, Germany, France, Spain and Netherlands to Ethiopia to carry out facial reconstructive surgery on the victims of the disease noma, and the acquisition of related surgical equipment, consumables and disposables for hospitals in Addis Ababa. The charity was founded in 1998. It has an office at West Stowell, Wiltshire.

== History ==
Facing Africa was founded in 1998 by Chris Lawrence. He was joined by Allan Thom, a consultant orthodontist. In 2000 Facing Africa joined the Sokoto NOMA Project. Facing Africa works together with the Dutch Noma Foundation, AWD-Stiftung Kinderhilfe and Resurge (former Interplast) and takes part in surgical missions offering financial, logistical and medical support and assistance in Sokoto in Sokoto, Nigeria.

In 2008, the charity cooperated in the making of a BBC documentary Make Me a New Face: Hope for Africa’s Hidden Children

== Fundraising events ==
- Marathon des Sables
