= Necrotizing gingivitis =

Non-contagious, painful bacterial infection of the gums

- Other names: NG, Trench mouth
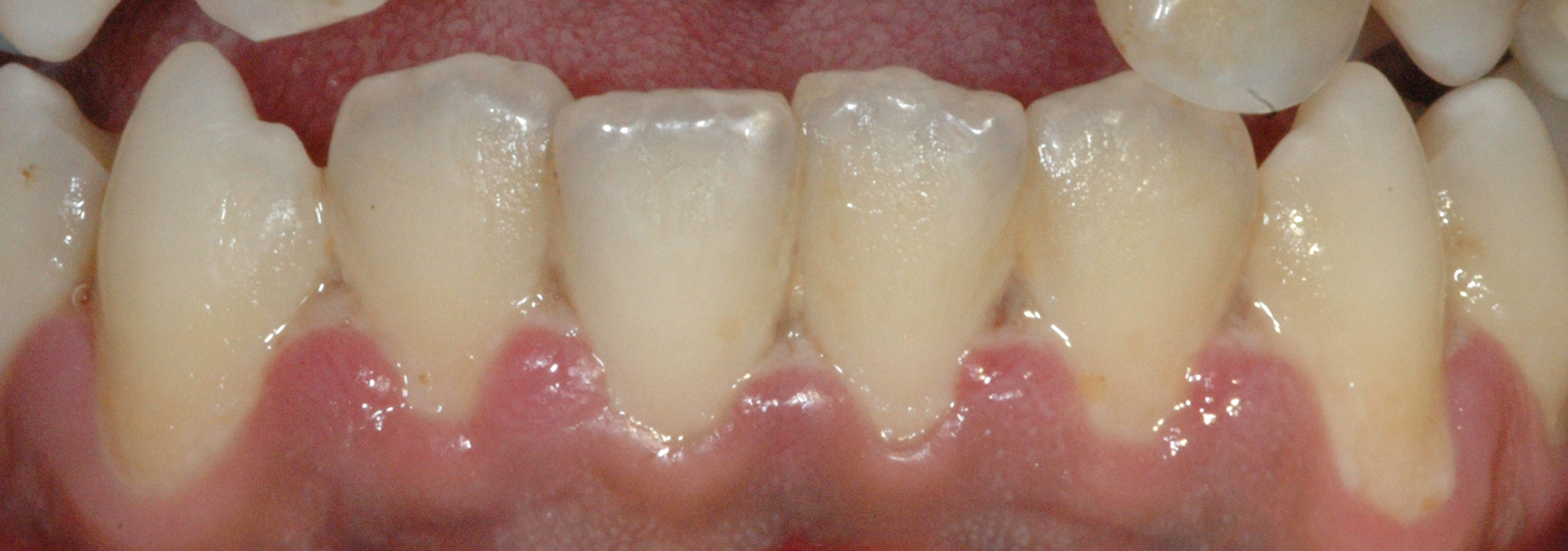
- A fairly mild presentation of necrotizing gingivitis at the typical site on the gums of the anterior mandibular teeth.
- Specialty: Periodontology
- Symptoms: pain, bad breath, fever, bleeding gums
- Complications: Progression
- Causes: bacterial infection by Prevotella intermedia, Treponema, Selenomonas, Fusobacterium spp, Spirochetes and compromised host immune response
- Risk factors: HIV/AIDS, malnutrition, psychological stress, sleep deprivation, inadequate oral hygiene, pre-existing gingivitis, history of necrotizing periodontal disease, tobacco and alcohol use, youth, white ethnicity, orthodontics
- Diagnostic method: Based on clinical findings (necrosis, ulcer of interdental papilla; gingival bleeding, pain, pseudomembrane formation, halitosis)
- Differential diagnosis: herpetic gingivostomatitis, mucous membrane pemphigoid, pemphigus vulgaris, toothbrush abrasion
- Prevention: oral hygiene
- Treatment: debridement (dental), metronidazole

Necrotizing gingivitis (NG) is a common, non-contagious infection of the gums with sudden onset. The main features are painful, bleeding gums, and ulceration of interdental papillae (the sections of gum between adjacent teeth). This disease, along with necrotizing periodontitis (NP) and necrotizing stomatitis, is classified as a necrotizing periodontal disease, one of the three general types of gum disease caused by inflammation of the gums (periodontitis).

The often severe gum pain that characterizes NG distinguishes it from the more common gingivitis or chronic periodontitis which is rarely painful. If NG is improperly treated or neglected, it may become chronic and/or recurrent. The causative organisms are mostly anaerobic bacteria, particularly Fusobacteriota and spirochete species.

Predisposing factors include poor oral hygiene, smoking, poor nutrition, psychological stress, and a weakened immune system. When the attachments of the teeth to the bone are involved, the term NP is used. Treatment of NG is by removal of dead gum tissue and antibiotics (usually metronidazole) in the acute phase, and improving oral hygiene to prevent recurrence. Although the condition has a rapid onset and is debilitating, it usually resolves quickly and does no serious harm. The informal name trench mouth arose during World War I as many soldiers developed the disease, probably because of the poor conditions and extreme psychological stress.

== Signs and symptoms ==
In the early stages some affected people may complain of a feeling of tightness around the teeth. Three signs/symptoms must be present to diagnose this condition:

- Severe gum pain.
- Profuse gum bleeding that requires little or no provocation.
- Interdental papillae are ulcerated with dead tissue. The papillary necrosis of NG has been described as "punched out".

Other signs and symptoms may be present, but not always.

- Foul breath.
- Bad taste (metallic taste).

Malaise, fever and/or cervical lymph node enlargement are rare (unlike the typical features of herpetic stomatitis). Pain is fairly well localized to the affected areas. Systemic reactions may be more pronounced in children. Cancrum oris (noma) is a very rare complication, usually in debilitated children. Similar features but with more intense pain may be seen in necrotizing periodontitis in HIV/AIDS.

== Causes ==
Necrotizing periodontal diseases are caused by a mixed bacterial infection that includes anaerobes such as P. intermedia and Fusobacterium as well as spirochetes, such as Treponema.

Necrotizing gingivitis may also be associated with diseases in which the immune system is compromised, including HIV/AIDS. Necrotizing gingivitis is an opportunistic infection that occurs on a background of impaired local or systemic host defenses. The predisposing factors for necrotizing gingivitis are smoking, psychological stress, malnutrition, and immunosuppression. Regarding malnutrition, the fact that vitamin C deficiency is associated with gum disease, loosening of teeth, and poor wound healing shows how poor nutrition can predispose to oral disease; in such a circumstance, immune defenses against bacterial attack are most likely lower than usual. It is thus plausible that poor rations and supply line interruptions in World War I contributed to the incidence of trench mouth.

The following zones of infection have been described (superficial to deep): the bacterial zone, the neutrophil rich zone, the necrotic zone and the spirochetal zone.

== Diagnosis ==
Diagnosis is usually clinical. Smear for fusospirochaetal bacteria and leukocytes; blood picture occasionally. The important differentiation is with acute leukemia or herpetic stomatitis.

=== Classification ===
Necrotizing gingivitis is part of a spectrum of disease termed necrotizing periodontal diseases. It is the most minor form of this spectrum, with more advanced stages being termed necrotizing periodontitis, necrotizing stomatitis, and the most extreme, cancrum oris.

Necrotizing periodontitis (NP) is where the infection leads to attachment loss, and involves only the gingiva, periodontal ligament and alveolar ligament. Progression of the disease into tissue beyond the mucogingival junction characterizes necrotizing stomatitis.

== Treatment ==
Treatment includes irrigation and debridement of necrotic areas (areas of dead and/or dying gum tissue), oral hygiene instruction and the uses of mouth rinses and pain medication. If there is systemic involvement, then oral antibiotics may be given, such as metronidazole. As these diseases are often associated with systemic medical issues, proper management of the systemic disorders is appropriate.

== Prognosis ==
Untreated, the infection may lead to rapid destruction of the periodontium and can spread, as necrotizing stomatitis or noma, into neighbouring tissues in the cheeks, lips or the bones of the jaw. As stated, the condition can occur and be especially dangerous in people with weakened immune systems. This progression to noma is possible in malnourished susceptible individuals, with severe disfigurement possible.

== Epidemiology ==
In developed countries, this disease occurs mostly in young adults. In developing countries, NUG may occur in children of low socioeconomic status, usually occurring with malnutrition (especially inadequate protein intake) and shortly after the onset of viral infections (e.g. measles).

Predisposing factors include smoking, viral respiratory infections and immune defects, such as in HIV/AIDS. Uncommon, except in lower socioeconomic classes, this typically affects adolescents and young adults, especially in institutions, armed forces, etc., or people with HIV/AIDS. The disease has occurred in epidemic-like patterns, but it is not contagious.

== History ==
Necrotizing gingivitis has been observed for centuries. Xenophon observes sore mouth and foul smelling breath in Greek soldiers in the 4th century BC. Hunter describes the clinical features of necrotizing gingivitis in 1778, differentiating it from scurvy (avitaminosis C) and chronic periodontitis. Jean Hyacinthe Vincent, a French physician working at the Paris Pasteur Institute describes a fusospirochetal infection of the pharynx and palatine tonsils, causing "ulcero-membranous pharyngitis and tonsillitis", which later became known as Vincent's angina. Later in 1904, Vincent describes the same pathogenic organisms in "ulceronecrotic gingivitis". Vincent's angina is sometimes confused with NUG, however the former is tonsillitis and pharyngitis, and the latter involves the gums, and usually the two conditions occur in isolation from each other.

The term trench mouth evolved because the disease was observed in front line soldiers during World War I, thought to be a result at least partly because of extreme psychologic stress they were exposed to. The same condition was appearing in civilians during periods of bombing raids, who were away from the front line, and who had relatively good diets during wartime due to rationing, so it is assumed that psychologic stress was the significant causative factor. It has also been associated with high tobacco use in the army.

Many other historical names for this condition (and Vincent's angina) have occurred, including: "acute membranous gingivitis", "fusospirillary gingivitis", " fusospirillosis", "fusospirochetal gingivitis", "phagedenic gingivitis", "Vincent stomatitis", "Vincent gingivitis", and "Vincent infection".

In the late 1980s-early 1990s, it was originally thought that some necrotizing periodontal diseases seen in severely affected AIDS patients were strictly a sequela of HIV, and it was even called HIV-associated periodontitis. It is now understood that its association with HIV/AIDS was due to the immunocompromised status of such patients; it also occurs with higher prevalence in association with other diseases in which the immune system is compromised.

The 1999 American Academy of Periodontology Classification termed the condition "necrotizing ulcerative periodontitis". The "ulcerative" descriptor was removed from the name, because ulceration is considered to be secondary to the necrosis.

== See also ==
- Canker sore
- Mouth ulcer
