= Noma neonatorum =

- Specialty: Dermatology

Noma neonatorum is a severe infection affecting very young or newborn children in impoverished environments. A gangrenous infection spreads across the oral, nasal and/or anal areas, and is frequently fatal. The pattern of lesions is similar to those found in noma, however unlike noma it is caused by Pseudomonas aeruginosa.

== See also ==
- Green nail syndrome
- List of cutaneous conditions
