= Hans Liebeschuetz =

German-British historian of the medieval period (1893–1978)

Prof. Hans Liebeschuetz
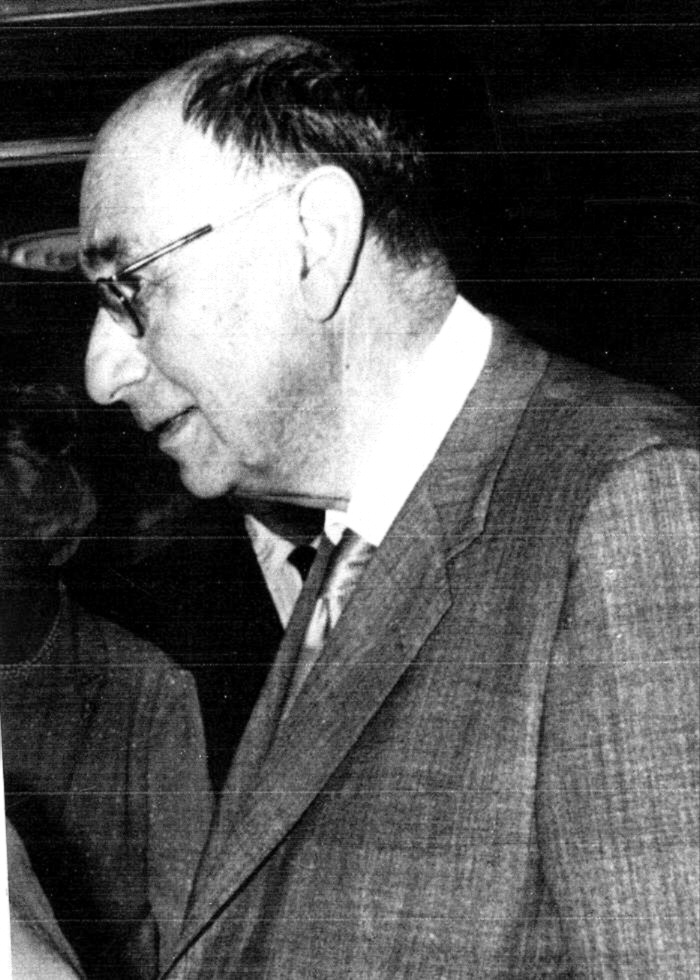
- Prof. Hans Liebeschuetz
- Born: 3 December 1893; Hamburg
- Died: 28 October 1978 (aged 84); Crosby, England
- Resting place: Golders Green Jewish Cemetery
- Education: University of Berlin
- Occupation: Medieval Historian
- Known for: Study of John of Salisbury
- Spouse: Rahel Plaut (m.1924)
- Children: Wolf. Hugo, Elisabeth

Hans Liebeschuetz (German: Liebeschütz; 3 December 1893 – 28 October 1978) was a medieval historian. He is best known for his study of John of Salisbury.

Born in Hamburg in 1893, he attended the universities of Hamburg and Heidelberg. After emigrating from Germany in March 1939 he later became a Reader in Medieval History at the University of Liverpool and later emeritus Professor. He helped found the Leo Baeck College which is now a privately funded rabbinical seminary.

== Early life ==
He was born in Hamburg in 1893, son of the physician Samuel Liebeschuetz and his wife Lizzy Olga Liebeschuetz (née Schönfeld). He first attended the scholar's school Gelehrtenschule des Johanneums in Hamburg and studied from 1912 at the University of Berlin. From 1914 to 1916 as a Lance Corporal serving with the Mecklenburg Regiment, he faced the French on the western front at the Battle of the Somme. His actions while raiding French lines lead to the award of an Iron Cross Class II. After serving for two years he contracted pneumonia and left the battle to recover at the military hospital at Geesthacht on the Elbe near Hamburg.

From 1918 onwards he continued his studies on a course shortened for war veterans (a `Kriegsnotsemester’) at Heidelberg University in Medieval History. He received his doctorate in 1920 under Karl Hampe, the subject of his dissertation was titled "The Relations of Frederick II, Holy Roman Emperor to England after 1235".

== Hamburg ==
From 1920 he worked at a Realschule (Secondary School) in the St Pauli, entertainment district of Hamburg and then moved in 1928 to the progressive Hamburg Lichtwarkschule (Helmut Schmidt attended this school graduating 1937). He found working at the school stimulating but being Jewish was forced to leave in 1934, as a consequence of the Law for the Restoration of the Professional Civil Service, a law passed by the National Socialist regime on 7 April 1933, two months after Adolf Hitler attained power. As a war veteran he was allowed to stay in employment for an extra year after this law came into force.

In 1922 he co-founded the B'nai B'rith Lodge of Hamburg. In addition to his work as a teacher, he was a member of the Warburg Institute. There he met Fritz Saxl, who was later to assist him in emigrating to England. In the year 1929 he habilitated with the writing "The allegorical world view of the holy Hildegard of Bingen ". After his dismissal from civil service in 1934 he had the good fortune to find employment at the rabbinical seminary for training Liberal Jewish rabbis, the Institut für die Wissenschaft des Judentums. This institute became an informal Jewish university. Here he taught medieval philosophy and was able to establish a relationship with Leo Baeck. In his spare time he devoted himself to Jewish adult education and lectured at various Jewish schools in Hamburg and Berlin.

In 1938 his family emigrated to England, while he initially remained in Hamburg. After the November pogroms of 1938, he was arrested and interned for four weeks in the Sachsenhausen concentration camp, being released on 11 December 38. In March 1939 he decided to follow his family to England, the departure was delayed by waiting for his mother’s visa.

== England ==
In 1940 as an Enemy Alien he lived in Internment on the Isle of Man. From 1942 he taught Latin at various schools in England. In 1946 he was hired as an assistant lecturer at the University of Liverpool, and the following year he became a British citizen. From 1955 he worked at the University of Liverpool as a Reader (the grade below Professor). In the same year he was involved in founding the Leo Baeck Institute. In 1957 he received the title of "unscheduled professor" from the University of Hamburg, whereupon he held regular guest lectures there from 1960 (the year of his retirement in Liverpool) until 1963.

In 1960, he became a corresponding member of the Monumenta Germaniae Historica and in 1969 the Göttingen Academy of Sciences. Throughout his life he remained very close to the city of Hamburg, and was able in 1977 give a lecture on Alfred Lichtwark in the auditorium of the former Lichtwarkschule.

== Family ==
In 1924 he married the Leipzig-born physician Rahel Plaut (1894–1993), daughter of the physician and bacteriologist Hugo Carl Plaut, with whom he had three children in the following years: Wolfgang (b. 1927, ancient historian), Hugo (b. 1929, doctor) and Elisabeth (1932–95, horticulturalist). Plaut's father was from 1913 to his death in 1928 head of the Mycological Research Institute at the Medical Faculty; Rahel was the first woman to do her habilitation at the Medical Faculty of Hamburg.

== Sources ==
- Fulgentius Metaforalis: A Contribution to the History Ancient Mythology in the Middle Ages. Leipzig: Teubner, 1926.
- The Allegorical Worldview of St. Hildegard of Bingen. – Leipzig: Teubner, 1930 (habilitation thesis).
- John of Salisbury and Pseudo-Plutarch. – London: Warburg Institute, 1943.
- Judaism in German History from Hegel to Max Weber. – Tuebingen: Mohr, 1967.
- From Georg Simmel to Franz Rosenzweig. – Tuebingen: Mohr, 1970.
- Judaism in the German Environment. – Tuebingen: Mohr, 1977.
- Kaiser, Silke (2022). Jüdische Identitität in Deutschland und im Exil, der Lebensweg des Wissenschaftlerpaars Hans und Rahel Liebeschuetz. Hamburg University Press. ISBN 978-3-943423-79-2. OCLC 1348378469.
- Fischer-Radizi, Doris; Wallstein-Verlag (2019). Vertrieben aus Hamburg die Ärztin Rahel Liebeschütz-Plaut (in German). Göttingen. ISBN 978-3-8353-3383-3. OCLC 1078164194.
- Ambrose, Saint, Bishop of Milan; Liebeschuetz, J. H. W. G.; Hill, Carole (2005). Political letters and speeches. Liverpool: Liverpool University Press. ISBN 0-85323-829-4. OCLC 58554877.

An extensive catalog of works can be found in Biographical Bibliographic Church Lexicon Biographisches bibliographisches Kirchen-Lexikon (BBKL), Vol. 29.

== Literature ==
- Peter Classen : Obituary Hans Liebeschütz. In: German Archive for Medieval Research 35 (1979), p. 711-713.
- Wolfgang Liebeschuetz: Liebeschütz, Hans. In: New German Biography (NDB). Volume 14, Duncker & Humblot, Berlin 1985, ISBN 3-428-00195-8, p 489 f. (Digitized).
- Silke Kaiser: Hans Liebeschütz. In: Biographical Bibliographic Church Lexicon (BBKL). Volume 29, Bautz, Nordhausen 2008, ISBN 978-3-88309-452-6, Sp. 813–821.
- Kirsten Heinsohn (Red.): The Jewish Hamburg . Göttingen 2006, ISBN 3-8353-0004-0 .
- Silke Kaiser: Liebeschütz, Hans . In: Hamburg Biography . Volume 1, Christians, Hamburg 2001, ISBN 3-7672-1364-8, pages 184–185.
