= Wolf Liebeschuetz =

British historian (1927–2022)

- Born: 22 June 1927; Hamburg, Germany
- Died: 12 July 2022
- Spouse: Margaret Taylor (m. 1955)
- Children: 4

Academic background
- Education: University College London
- Doctoral advisor: Arnaldo Momigliano

Academic work
- Discipline: History
- Sub-discipline: Late Antiquity
- Institutions: University of Leicester; University of Nottingham

John Hugo Wolfgang Gideon Liebeschuetz FBA (22 June 1927 - 11 July 2022) was a German-born British historian who specialized in late antiquity.

== Early life ==
John Hugo Wolfgang Gideon Liebeschuetz was born in Hamburg on 22 June 1927, the son of historian Hans Liebeschuetz and physician Rahel Plaut. His father was a prominent medievalist who taught at the University of Hamburg. The family had been wealthy, having inherited a large fortune from Wolf's great-grandfather Brach, who amassed wealth trading in Texas and Mexico though much was lost in the German inflation. The Liebeschuetz family was Jewish, and were subjected to increasing persecution following the seizure of power by the Nazis. As a young boy, Liebeschuetz was expelled from junior school because he was Jewish, and was subsequently taught at a very small all-Jewish school. Although his family was able to escape, his teacher was eventually murdered in the Holocaust. His father was twice arrested by the Gestapo and imprisoned in the Sachsenhausen concentration camp after the Kristallnacht of November 1938. The four children had received English lessons since 1934 and were sent to England on 12 December. The parents and two grandmothers followed soon after. The emigration of Hans Liebeschuetz was sponsored by the Warburg Institute, with whom the family had long been closely associated.

After arriving in England, the Liebeschuetz family eventually settled in Epsom. Hans Liebeschuetz taught Latin at a number of schools and after the war he became a lecturer at the University of Liverpool. After his retirement he played an important role in founding the Leo Baeck Institute in London.

== Education ==
Liebeschuetz gained his Higher School Certificate at Whitgift School, Croydon in 1944. He initially intended to study medicine. He performed National Service in the Canal Zone in Egypt, as a sergeant in the Royal Army Educational Corps. Liebeschuetz studied Ancient and Medieval History at University College London, where his teachers included A. H. M. Jones and John Morris. After graduating in 1951, Liebeschuetz took a one-year postgraduate certificate in education at Westminster College London. He later studied for his Ph.D. at University College London. His supervisor was Arnaldo Momigliano, and Liebeschuetz was able to consult T. B. L. Webster and Robert Browning.

== Career ==
After gaining his doctorate, Liebeschuetz worked from 1958 to 1963 as a teacher mainly at Heanor Grammar School, Derbyshire. In 1963, he was appointed Assistant Lecturer at the Classics Department at the University of Leicester, which was then under the leadership of Professor Abraham Wasserstein. In 1972, he published the monograph Antioch: City and Imperial Administration in the Later Roman Empire.

In 1979, he was appointed Professor and Head of the Department of Classical and Archaeological Studies at the University of Nottingham. This position had previously been held by E. A. Thompson. 1979 was also the year of the publishing of his monograph Continuity and Change in Roman Religion, which examined how Roman religion worked and how it was abandoned. In the early 1990s Liebeschuetz became increasingly interested in the role of "barbarians" in the fall of the Western Roman Empire. His Barbarians and Bishops (1990) is concerned with this topic.

== Retirement ==
Liebeschuetz retired in 1992, and was elected a Fellow of the British Academy the same year. In 1993 he was made a Fellow of the Royal Society of Arts, and a Member of the Institute for Advanced Study in Princeton, New Jersey.

== Research ==
Liebeschuetz's research centred on late antiquity, particularly the nature of Roman cities and Roman religion during this time. He argued that Roman religion remained strong well into late antiquity.

In the later part of his career, Liebeschuetz examined the role of "barbarians" in the fall of the Western Roman Empire. Discussing the ethnogenesis model developed by Herwig Wolfram of the Vienna School of History, Liebeschuetz argued that the Visigoths emerged as a people under the leadership of Alaric I and his successors. He further argued that parts of the Getica of Jordanes, such as the account of a Gothic migration from Scandinavia towards the Black Sea, are derived from genuinely Gothic oral traditions. Liebeschuetz maintained that the early Germanic peoples shared closely related language, culture and identity, and considered that the concept of Germanic peoples remains indispensable for scholarship. In the 1990s Liebeschuetz was a participant in the Transformation of the Roman World project, which was sponsored by the European Science Foundation. He felt that many members of this project denied the impact or even existence of Germanic peoples, and also sought to refute the traditional idea that the Roman Empire had declined. Liebeschuetz argued that these scholars were practising an ideologically dogmatic and flawed form of scholarship, and manipulating history to promote multiculturalism and European federalism.

== Personal life ==
Liebeschuetz married Margaret Taylor in 1955, with whom he had three daughters and one son and five grandchildren.

== Selected bibliography ==
- Antioch: City and Imperial Administration in the Later Roman Empire. Clarendon Press. 1972. ISBN 9780198142959.
- Continuity and Change in Roman Religion. Clarendon Press. 1979. ISBN 9780198148227.
- Barbarians and Bishops: Army, Church, and State in the Age of Arcadius and Chrysostom. Clarendon Press. 1990. ISBN 9780198148869.
- Decline and Fall of the Roman City. Oxford University Press. 2001. ISBN 9780198152477.
- Decline and Change in Late Antiquity: Religion, Barbarians and Their Historiography. Ashgate. 2006. ISBN 9780860789901.
- Ambrose and John Chrysostom: Clerics Between Desert and Empire. Oxford University Press. 2011. ISBN 9780199596645.
- East and West in Late Antiquity: Invasion, Settlement, Ethnogenesis and Conflicts of Religion. Brill. 2015. ISBN 9789004289529.

== Sources ==
- Drinkwater, J. F. (2007). "J. H. W. G. Liebeschuetz: An Introduction". In Drinkwater, John; Salway, Benet (eds.). Wolf Liebeschuetz Reflected: Essays Presented By Colleagues, Friends & Pupils. Bulletin of the Institute of Classical Studies. Supplement. Vol. 91. Oxford University Press. pp. 1–3. JSTOR 43767806.
- Fischer-Radizi, Doris (2019). Vertreibung aus Hamburg. Die Ärztin Rahel Liebeschütz-Plaut. Wissenschaftler in Hamburg (in German). Göttingen: Wallstein. ISBN 978-3-8353-3383-3.
- Kaiser, Silke (2021). Jüdische Identität in Deutschland und im Exil: Der Lebensweg des Wissenschaftlerehepaars Hans und Rahel Liebeschütz. Hamburger Historische Forschungen (in German). Vol. 7 (2 ed.). Hamburg University Press. doi:10.15460/HUP.HHF.07.210. ISBN 978-3-943423-79-2.
- Liebeschuetz, Wolf (2015). East and West in Late Antiquity: Invasion, Settlement, Ethnogenesis and Conflicts of Religion. Impact of Empire. Vol. 20. Brill. ISBN 978-90-04-28952-9. ISSN 1572-0500.
