= Noma (disease) =

- Other names: cancrum oris, stomatitis gangrenosa
- Specialty: Pediatrics, otorhinolaryngology, dentistry
- Symptoms: Facial edema, fever, gangrene of face
- Complications: Sepsis and death, facial disfigurement, difficulty eating/drinking, social stigma
- Usual onset: Age 2–6 years
- Duration: Acute phase lasts 2–4 weeks
- Causes: Opportunistic infection
- Risk factors: Extreme poverty, malnutrition, immunosuppression
- Diagnostic method: Based on symptoms
- Differential diagnosis: Oral cancer, leishmaniasis, leprosy
- Prevention: Adequate nutrition, oral hygiene
- Treatment: Antibiotics, nutritional supplements, oral hygiene
- Medication: Antibiotics
- Prognosis: 90% fatality rate without treatment
- Frequency: 140,000 new cases per year (1998 estimate)

Noma (also known as gangrenous stomatitis or cancrum oris) is a rapidly-progressive and often-fatal gangrenous infection of the mouth and face. Noma usually begins as an ulcer on the gums and rapidly spreads into the jawbone, cheek, and facial soft tissues. This is followed by death of the facial tissues and fatal sepsis. Survivors are left with severe facial disfigurement often with impairments in breathing, swallowing, speaking, and vision. In 2023, noma was added to the World Health Organization's list of neglected tropical diseases.

This disease is linked to poverty and malnutrition; noma has also been seen in severely immunocompromised people in the developed world. It is preventable by proper nutrition and oral hygiene. Noma is most common in impoverished environments with poor healthcare infrastructure; as a result, many cases go undiagnosed, untreated, and unreported. It is an opportunistic infection linked to several microbes that take advantage of malnutrition and compromised immunity. There is no evidence of direct transmission from person to person.

In the early stages, it can be treated effectively with antibiotics and nutrition supplements. If diagnosed early enough, there can be proper wound healing. After recovering, patients with disfigurement require complex surgical rehabilitation.

There are no reliable estimates of its prevalence – in 1998 WHO estimated that there were 140,000 cases per year with a fatality rate of 90%. It predominantly affects children between the ages of two and six years in the least developed countries around the world, primarily in sub-Saharan Africa. Noma survivors experience stigma, social isolation, and discrimination within their communities. These can be countered by education and community outreach programs.

== Signs and symptoms ==
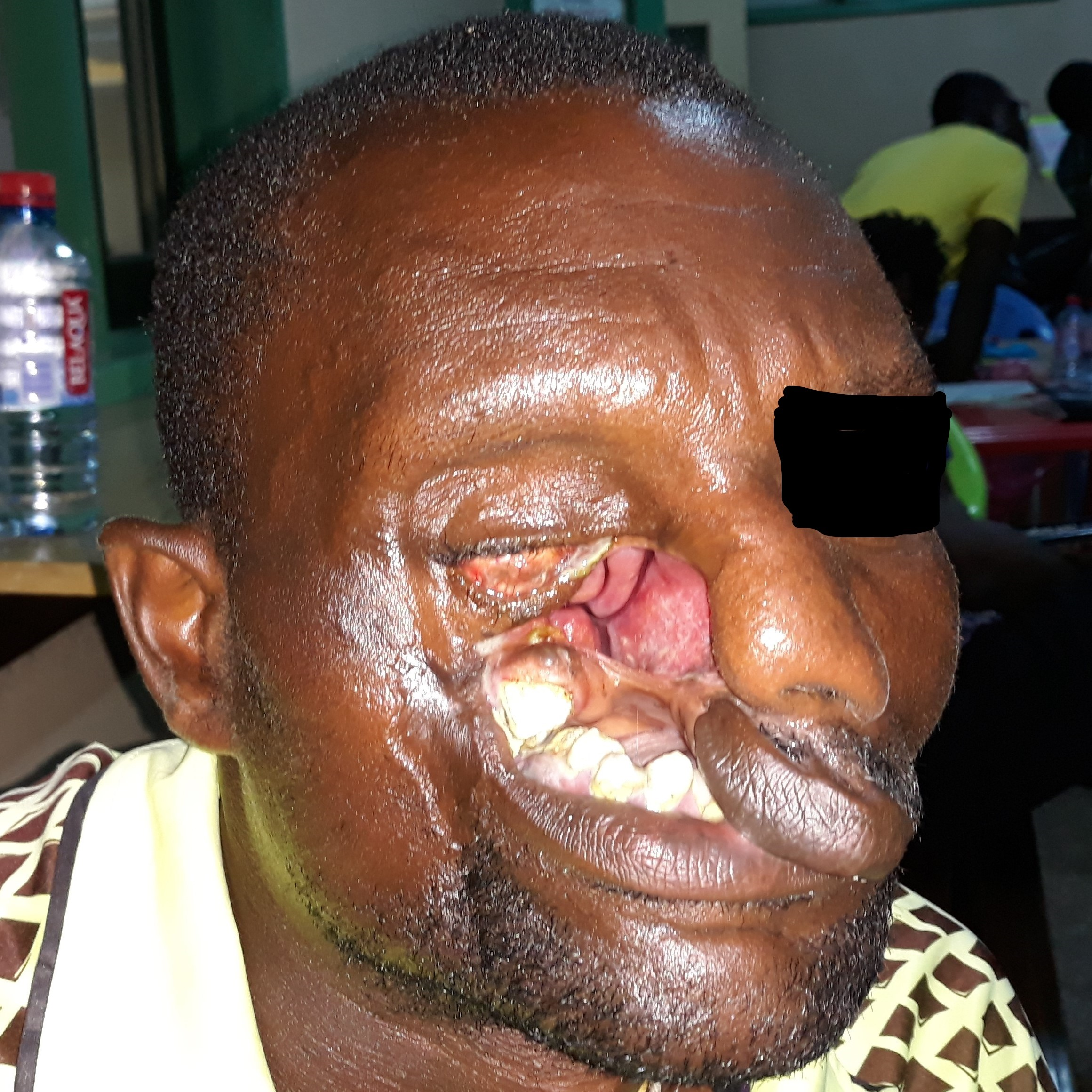
Severe facial disfigurement resulting from gangrenous stomatitis (cancrum oris)

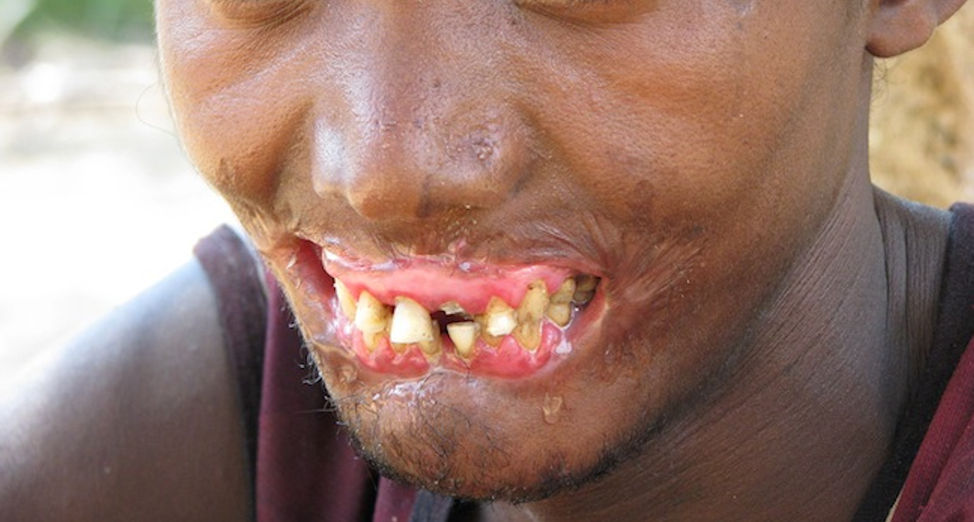
A man with scarring and disfigurement resulting from noma

Initially, there may be a small ulcer in the mouth which progresses into necrotizing gingivitis – painful bleeding of the gums and inter-dental papillae. This is followed by a rapid spread of the infection resulting in more general inflammation of the mouth and lips, facial edema, and foul breath. If untreated, within a few days the necrotizing infection progresses into the facial muscles, the skin, and the upper and lower jaw resulting in tissue destruction and sloughing. Many patients die due to sepsis; survivors are left with permanent scarring and disfigurement.

Noma neonatorum is a severe infection affecting very young or newborn children in impoverished environments. A gangrenous infection spreads across the oral, nasal, and/or anal areas, and is frequently fatal. The pattern of lesions is similar to those found in noma.

The World Health Organization divides noma into five stages: Acute necrotizing gingivitis, edema, gangrenous, scarring, and sequelae.

=== Warning signs ===
Before the development of noma, there may be simple gingivitis: Inflammation and reddening of the gums, which bleed when touched or during toothbrushing. The WHO recommends disinfectant mouthwash; if not available, use warm, salted water that has been boiled. A high-protein diet, vitamin A supplements, and patient education on oral hygiene are also recommended to prevent noma from progressing to the acute stages.

=== Stage I: Acute necrotizing gingivitis ===
This is the first stage of noma. The gums are red or reddish-purple and bleed spontaneously. The child has fetid breath and may drool. Painful ulcers of the gums develop, causing trouble eating. If the patient is malnourished and has recently been sick with an infectious disease, such as measles or chickenpox, they are at more risk for developing noma. Fever may develop at this stage, which can persist indefinitely. Appropriate treatment at this stage can halt the disease.

=== Stage II: Edema ===
This stage begins the acute phase of noma. The telltale sign is facial edema (swelling) of the lips, cheeks, eyes, etc. Ulceration of the gums worsens during this stage; ulceration may spread to the mucosa (soft, mucus-producing tissue) of the mouth and nose. The patient may feel pain or soreness in their mouth and cheeks. Other symptoms at this stage include fever, drooling, fetid breath, lymphadenopathy (swollen lymph nodes), and difficulty eating. Progression of the disease can be halted with appropriate treatment.

=== Stage III: Gangrene ===
At this and subsequent stages, although the disease can still be treated, sequelae will inevitably set in. In this stage, the infection eats away at the soft tissue of the patient's face. The gangrene may affect the cheeks, lips, nose, mouth, and nasal and oral cavities. Dead tissue sloughs away over time, leaving holes in the face and the soft tissue, possibly exposing bones and teeth. The patient is apathetic, has little appetite, and has great difficulty eating. At this stage, there is a high risk of sepsis leading to death.

=== Stage IV: Scarring ===
The acute phase is over, but the patient's life is still at risk, and treatment is recommended. This stage lasts one to two weeks. The patient may experience trismus (difficulty moving/opening the jaw), scars will form, and any exposed teeth will set in place.

=== Stage V: Sequelae ===
The disease is over, but sequelae from the gangrenous and scarring stages remain. Tissue may be missing, teeth may still be exposed, and the face may be disfigured. The patient may have difficulty eating, drinking, and speaking. Teeth may become set in the wrong places, or be lost altogether. There may still be problems with drooling and with opening/closing the jaw. Reconstructive surgery is an option at this phase. Social reintegration is also very important.

== Epidemiology ==
As of December 2023, most people who acquire this disease are between the ages of two and six years old, living in the poorest countries of the world. Accurate figures for noma prevalence are not available due to difficulties in diagnosis and reporting in the endemic areas. In 1998, the World Health Organization estimated that 140,000 new cases were occurring each year, with a 90% fatality rate, and a total of 770,000 surviving with scarring or disfigurement.

Noma is associated with a very high morbidity, and a mortality rate of approximately 90 percent. The prognosis is much better with treatment; if children have access to medical care, the mortality rate drops to under 10 percent. After gangrene sets in, patients are likely to die of sepsis within one to two weeks.

=== Causes and risks ===
Noma is an opportunistic rather than contagious infection. No single pathogen has been associated with the disease (the causative organisms are common in many environments) and there are no documented cases of person to person transmission. The underlying causes for this disease are extreme poverty, malnutrition, other causes of immunosuppression, underlying infections, and poor oral health. The disease principally affects extremely impoverished and malnourished children between 2 and 6 years old in tropical regions. Cases of noma have also been reported in malnourished or immunosuppressed adults, and in concentration camps during the Second World War.

Predisposing factors include:

- malnutrition and vitamin deficiency
- immunodeficiency
- poor oral hygiene
- recent illness (especially acute necrotizing ulcerative gingivitis, measles, malaria, or kwashiorkor),
- social and environmental factors such as maternal malnutrition and closely spaced pregnancies that result in offspring with weakened immune systems

In 2026 a newly discovered bacterium, Treponema A, was found in tissue samples from current sufferers of the disease as well as in historic samples. Further research is needed to establish if this could be a causative factor.

=== Treatment ===
When noma is detected early, its progression can be rapidly halted through basic hygiene, antibiotics, and improved nutrition. However, its physical effects are permanent and may require oral and maxillofacial surgery or reconstructive plastic surgery to repair. Treatments for noma in the acute stage include penicillin, sulfonamides, and other antibiotics.

In all stages of noma, the World Health Organization encourages antibiotics, vitamin A supplements or other nutritional supplements, a high-protein diet, and proper hydration.

The World Health Organization recommends using amoxicillin and metronidazole in tandem to treat stage I noma (acute necrotizing gingivitis), along with the use of chlorhexidine and hydrogen peroxide to clean the mouth and gums.

For stage II noma (edema phase), stage III noma (acute/gangrenous stage), and stage IV noma (scarring phase), the WHO recommends either one of two therapies. The first therapy includes the concurrent use of amoxicillin, clavulanic acid, gentamicin, and metronidazole. The second option includes the concurrent use of ampicillin, gentamicin, and metronidazole. For both options, chlorhexidine mouthwash is advised. For stage III and IV noma, the use of ketamine, and honey are both given as options for dressing the lesions.

Reconstruction is usually very challenging and should be delayed until full recovery (usually about one year following initial intervention).

== History ==
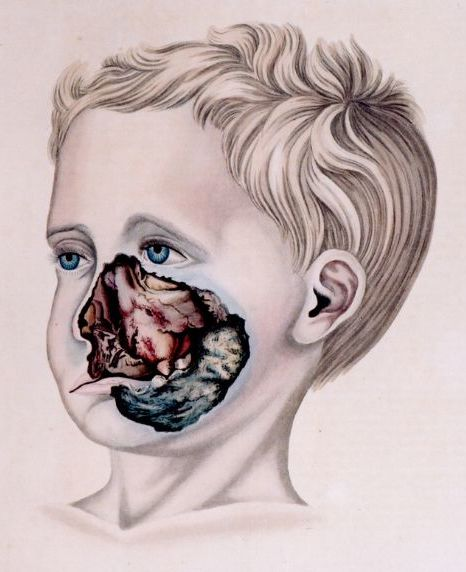
Noma (sketch from 1836)

Known in antiquity to such medical doctors as Hippocrates and Galen, noma was once reported around the world, including in Europe and the United States. The disease was well-known in the Netherlands in the 1500s and 1600s. The first clinical description of noma was in 1595 by a Dutch man, Carolus Battus. Dutch surgeon Cornelis van de Voorde first used the term "noma" to describe the disease in 1680. A European scientist, Gabriel Lund, attributed noma to poverty, cramped living conditions, and malnutrition in 1765. English medical doctor John Addington Symmonds linked the disease to previous infection with measles. The first surgical treatment for noma sequelae was performed in 1781. Surgical treatments for sequelae developed throughout the 1800s. In the late 1800s, scientists suspected that noma was caused by bacteria.

With improvements in hygiene and nutrition, noma has disappeared from industrialized countries since the 20th century, except during World War II when it was endemic to the Auschwitz and Belsen concentration camps. The disease and treatments were studied by Berthold Epstein, a Czech medical doctor and forced-labor prisoner who had recommended the study under Josef Mengele's direction.

Since 1970, there has been little research done on noma, with few exceptions. One such exception is Cyril Enwonwu, a Nigerian scientist focusing on noma.

Nigeria is home to two of the few hospitals in the world that focus on treating noma patients: Sokoto Noma Hospital, in the city of Sokoto, and the Noma Centre Abuja (built and funded by the Noma Aid Nigeria Initiative) in 2022 .

In January 2023 the Nigerian Ministry of Health submitted to the World Health Organization a request for noma to be added to WHO's list of neglected tropical diseases. This had been endorsed by 31 countries, and was accompanied by a dossier of evidence demonstrating that noma fit the criteria for inclusion. In December 2023 WHO conceded the request. It is hoped that this will encourage more research into the disease.

=== Etymology ===
The word "noma" derives from the classical Greek word νομή, used to describe the continuing process of a fire or an ulcer.

== Society and culture ==
People with noma and noma survivors may face stigma. Some think that noma is a contagious disease, so they avoid noma sufferers and survivors to avoid contracting it. Parents may hide afflicted children within the home because of social stigma, which can prevent them from getting treatment. Some also believe noma may be caused by witchcraft or a curse on the child's parents. Based on one 1997 estimate, roughly 770,000 people worldwide live with noma sequelae. However, "noma is a disease of shame," and children are sometimes hidden in isolation rather than being sent to receive treatment.

In Nigeria, sufferers and their families may seek traditional medicine rather than go to a medical center. In a study of 7,185 noma sufferers across Nigeria, only 19% reported going to a hospital or medical center upon discovering a facial lesion. 47.6% took 1–3 weeks to visit a hospital; the rest took longer to visit a hospital.

Children and other noma survivors in Africa are helped by a few international charitable organizations, such as Facing Africa, a UK registered charity that helps affected Ethiopians, and Swiss charity Winds of Hope. The Hilfsaktion Noma E.v is a non-governmental organization that has been involved in the management of Noma survivors for 30 years. They have a presence in 9 countries within the sub-Saharan Noma belt and have two fully funded clinics for the comprehensive management of Noma patients (one in Niger Republic and the other in Guinea Bissau). There are two dedicated Noma hospitals in Nigeria, the first and oldest of which is the Noma Children Hospital Sokoto, staffed by resident and visiting medical teams supported by Médecins Sans Frontières. Some of the staff are noma survivors. The second and more recently commissioned centre is the Noma Centre Abuja, fully funded and sponsored by the Noma Aid Nigeria Initiative, where holistic and compressive management of the Noma patients is given. The team consists of a resident medical and surgical team and visiting surgeons from Europe.

In other countries, such as Ethiopia, international charities work in collaboration with the local health care system to provide complex reconstructive surgery which can give back facial functions such as eating, speaking, and smiling. Teams of volunteer medics coming from abroad are often needed to support the local capacity to address the most severe cases, which can be extremely challenging even for senior maxillofacial surgeons. On 10 June 2010, the work of such volunteer surgeons was featured in a UK BBC Two documentary presented by Ben Fogle, Make Me a New Face: Hope for Africa's Hidden Children.

== See also ==
- Necrotizing fasciitis
