= Gustav Plaut =

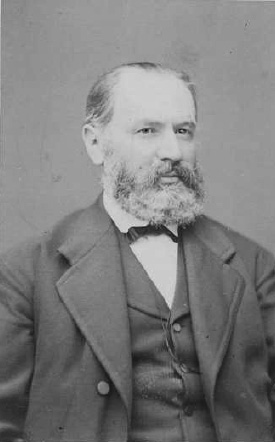
- Born: Gustav Plaut; 26 February 1824; Nordhausen, Thuringia, Germany
- Died: 3 July 1908; Hamburg
- Occupation: Banker
- Known for: Finance of trade & railways
- Spouse: Bertha Oppenheimer

Gustav Plaut (26 February 1824 – 3 July 1908) was a German banker who funded trade with Russia and Poland as well a number of railways. He also rescued the King of Saxony’s gold and jewels from the advancing Austrian army.

== Life and career ==
Plaut was the fifth child and third son of Herz C Plaut and Caroline (née Blach), from Reichensachsen (near Eschwege) on the border between Thuringia and Hesse. Herz C Plaut founded the firm H C Plaut (Bankhaus H. C. Plaut), in 1815. As can be seen in the Nordhausen Directory of 1834, it is listed as a money-changer. The Nordhausen Weekly Journal (Nordhäusische Wöchentliche Nachrichtsblatt) contains an advertisement for the bank that offers to cash winnings from the Bavarian Premium Lottery, and also sell Prussian State Securities.

Herz C Plaut died in 1835, possibly from cholera in an epidemic exacerbated by conditions created by the wars of liberation. Gustav’s mother Caroline took over the running of the business. Gustav left school and entered his mothers bank at the age of 14 as an apprentice, by 1850 he was a partner. Four years later in 1854 he married Bertha Oppenheimer from the Hamburg branch of this family.

The Leipzig branch of the H. C. Plaut Bank financed trade with Russia and Poland, in particular at the annual Leipzig Trade Fair. Later as the railway network spread the bank became involved with its finance for lines between Leipzig to Erfurt and Nordhausen. Plaut's work with the railways led to his membership of the board of twelve railway companies. He also became a councillor (stadtverordneter) for the city of Leipzig.

As Plaut's knowledge and circle of influence grew he became a financial advisor to the rulers of Thuringen including the Georg II, Duke of Saxe-Meiningen. The Duke offered Plaut the title of Adel (equivalent to Baron in English) for which he would have to pay a fee. After discussion with his son Hugo he declined the title. In 1866 during the wars of liberation, Plaut rescued the gold and jewels of the King of Saxony along with his manservant by hiding the treasure under a stack of potatoes covered by a tarpaulin on a horse drawn cart.

Aged 51 in 1874, Plaut retired from the bank and ceded control to his business partner Sieskind whose descendants ran the business until the Nazis closed it down. (In Prussia conditions for private banking had been favourable but the formation of the Reich permitted the foundation of new limited companies that made private banking less profitable.)
