= Jean Hyacinthe Vincent =

French physician

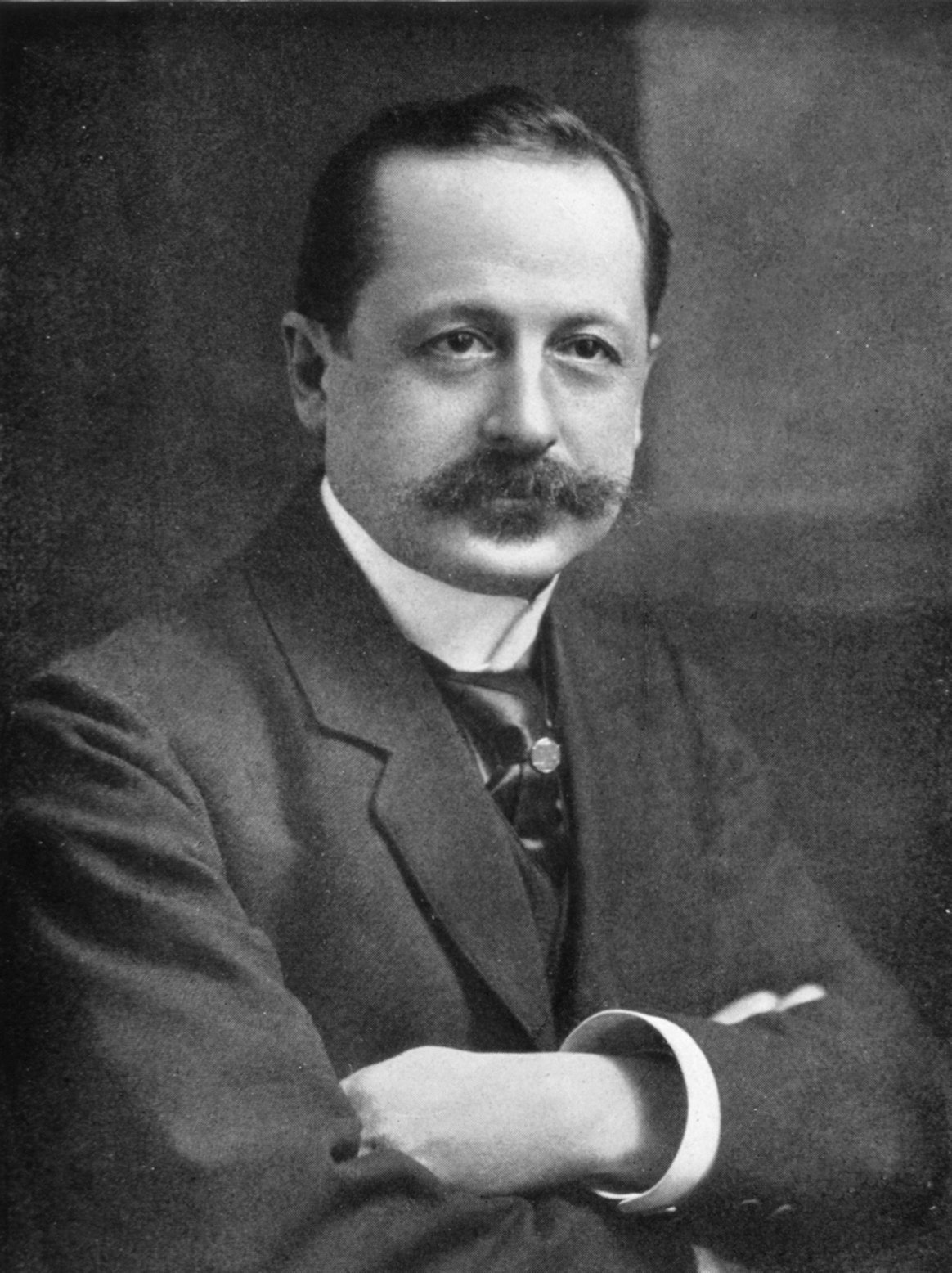
Hyacinthe Vincent

Jean Hyacinthe Henri Vincent (22 December 1862 – 23 November 1950) was a French physician who was a native of Bordeaux. He was an associate professor at Val-de-Grâce, as well as medical inspector general with the French Army. Later he attained the chair of epidemiology at Collège de France.

Vincent is credited with the discovery of the organisms that cause an acute infection of the oral soft tissues, including the tonsils and pharynx. This condition is caused by the combination of the fusiform bacilli (Bacillus fusiformis), and the spirochete (Borrelia vincentii). The disease was called Vincent's angina in honor of his discovery. Many publications using the term "Vincent's angina" date from the twentieth century, and the term is not so common in modern times. When the gums are involved, it was termed "Vincent's gingivitis". In modern times, Vincent's gingivitis is usually termed necrotizing ulcerative gingivitis (sometimes known as trench mouth).

He is also remembered for his work with vaccines, and his successful inoculations of the French Army against typhoid fever and paratyphoid fever, types A and B. He started these vaccinations in 1910, and they were continued during World War I. Marshals Joseph Joffre (1852–1931) and Ferdinand Foch (1851–1929) paid homage to Vincent and his medical work that saved countless lives.
