= Gingivitis =

Inflammation of the gums

- Other names: Ulitis, Early-stage gum disease
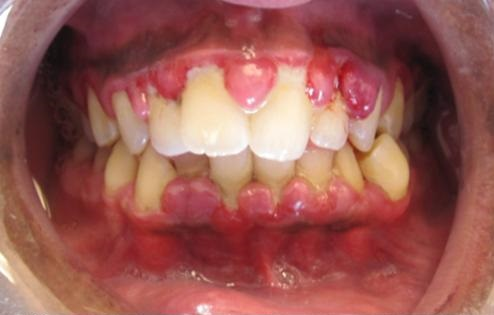
- A severe case of gingivitis
- Specialty: Dentistry
- Complications: Periodontal disease

Gingivitis, also known as ulitis, is a non-destructive disease that causes inflammation of the gums. The most common form of gingivitis, and the most common form of periodontal disease, is in response to bacterial biofilms (also called plaque) that are attached to tooth surfaces, termed plaque-induced gingivitis. Most forms of gingivitis are plaque-induced.

Although gingivitis does not always progress to periodontitis, periodontitis is always preceded by gingivitis.

Gingivitis is reversible with good oral hygiene; however, without treatment, gingivitis can progress to periodontitis, in which the inflammation of the gums results in tissue destruction and bone resorption around the teeth. Periodontitis can ultimately lead to tooth loss.

== Signs and symptoms ==
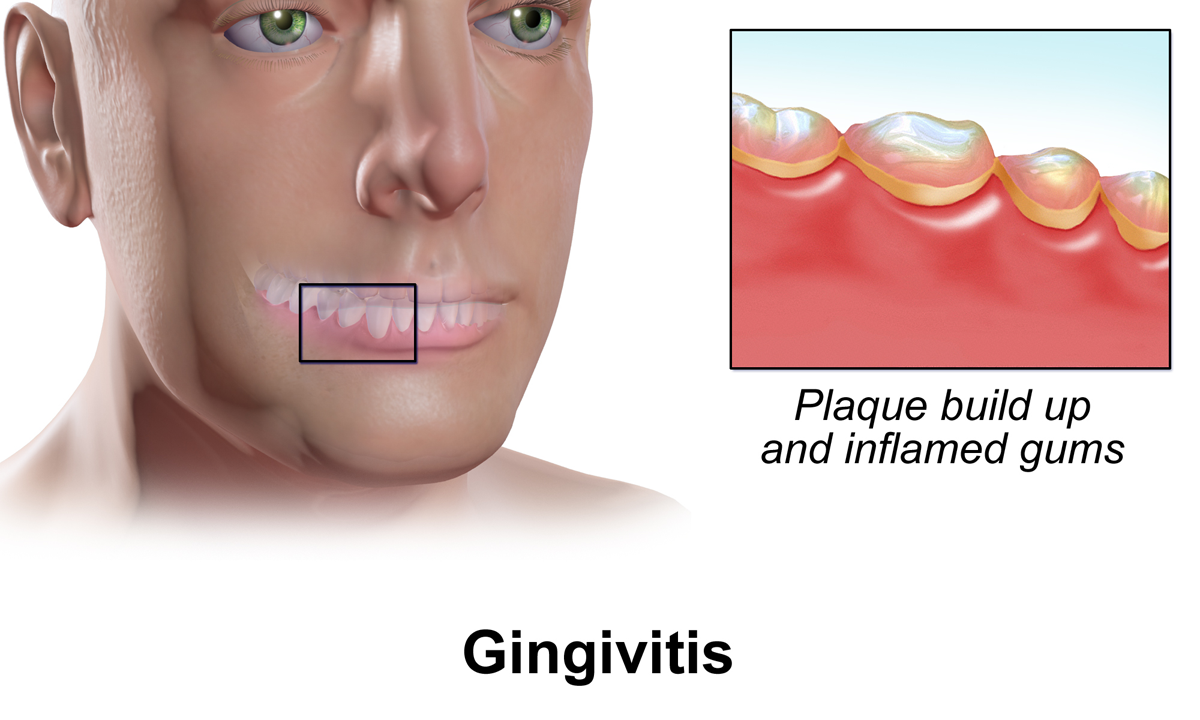
Gingivitis

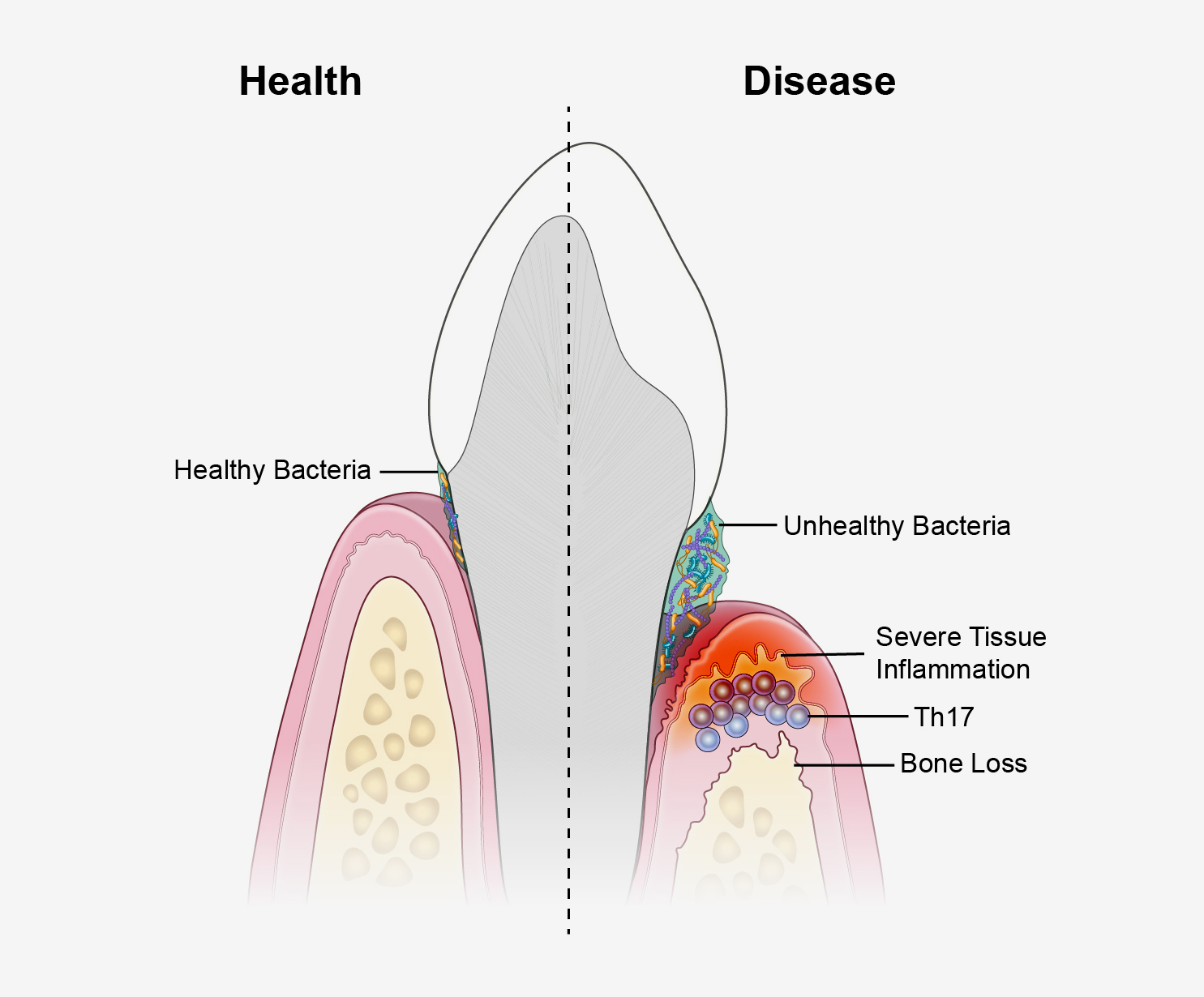
Periodontal disease may be driven by T_{h}17 cells, which are triggered by an unhealthy bacterial community

The signs and symptoms of gingivitis include:

- Swollen gums
- Bright red gums
- Gums that are tender or painful to the touch
- Bleeding gums or bleeding after brushing and/or flossing
- Bad breath (halitosis)

Additionally, the stippling that normally exists in the gum tissue will often disappear, and the gums may appear shiny as the gum tissue becomes swollen and stretched over the inflamed underlying connective tissue. The gingiva may become ulcerated and the gums may bleed with even gentle probing or brushing, and especially when flossing.

=== Complications ===
- Gingival recession
- Chronic periodontitis
- Aggressive periodontitis
- Necrotizing gingivitis and other necrotizing periodontal diseases

In addition to the above, there is limited data to suggest an association between gingivitis and premature birth, low birth weight, and Alzheimer's disease.

== Cause ==
The cause of plaque-induced gingivitis is bacterial plaque, which acts to initiate the body's host response. This, in turn, can lead to destruction of the gingival tissues, which may progress to destruction of the periodontal attachment apparatus. The plaque accumulates in the small gaps between teeth, in the gingival grooves and in areas known as plaque traps: locations that accumulate and maintain plaque. Examples of plaque traps include bulky and overhanging restorative margins, clasps of removable partial dentures, and calculus (tartar) that forms on teeth. Although these accumulations may be tiny, the bacteria in them produce chemicals, such as degradative enzymes, and toxins, such as lipopolysaccharide (LPS, otherwise known as endotoxin) or lipoteichoic acid (LTA), that promote an inflammatory response in the gum tissue. This inflammation can cause an enlargement of the gingiva and subsequent formation. Early plaque in health consists of a relatively simple bacterial community dominated by Gram-positive cocci and rods. As plaque matures and gingivitis develops, the communities become increasingly complex with higher proportions of Gram-negative rods, fusiforms, filaments, spirilla and spirochetes. Later experimental gingivitis studies, using culture, provided more information regarding the specific bacterial species present in plaque. Taxa associated with gingivitis included Fusobacterium nucleatum subspecies polymorphum, Lachnospiraceae [G-2] species HOT100, Lautropia species HOTA94, and Prevotella oulorum (a species of Prevotella bacterium), whilst Rothia dentocariosa was associated with periodontal health. Further study of these taxa is warranted and may lead to new therapeutic approaches to prevent periodontal disease, including systemic health.

=== Risk factors ===
Risk factors associated with gingivitis include the following:

- poor oral hygiene
- overly aggressive oral hygiene, such as brushing with stiff bristles
- orthodontic braces
- medications and conditions that dry the mouth
- cigarette smoking
- pregnancy
- pre-existing conditions such as diabetes
- drinking
- obesity.

== Diagnosis ==
Gingivitis is a category of periodontal disease in which there is no loss of bone, but inflammation and bleeding are present.

Each tooth is divided into four gingival units (mesial, distal, buccal, and lingual) and given a score from 0–3 based on the gingival index. The four scores are then averaged to give each tooth a single score.

The diagnosis of the periodontal disease, gingivitis, is made by a dentist. The diagnosis is based on clinical assessment data acquired during a comprehensive periodontal examination. Either a registered dental hygienist or a dentist may perform the comprehensive periodontal examination, but the data interpretation and diagnosis are done by the dentist. The comprehensive periodontal examination consists of a visual examination, a series of radiographs, probing of the gingiva, determining the extent of current or past damage to the periodontium, and a comprehensive review of the medical and dental histories.

Current research shows that activity levels of the following enzymes in saliva samples are associated with periodontal destruction: aspartate aminotransferase (AST), alanine aminotransferase (ALT), gamma glutamyl transferase (GGT), alkaline phosphatase (ALP), and acid phosphatase (ACP). Therefore, these enzyme biomarkers may be used to aid in the diagnosis and treatment of gingivitis and periodontitis.

A dental hygienist or dentist will check for the symptoms of gingivitis and may also examine the amount of plaque in the oral cavity. A dental hygienist or dentist will also look for signs of periodontitis using X-rays or periodontal probing as well as other methods.

If gingivitis is not responsive to treatment, referral to a periodontist (a specialist in diseases of the gingiva and bone around teeth and dental implants) for further treatment may be necessary.

=== Classification ===
As defined by the 2017 World Workshop, periodontal health, gingival diseases/conditions have been categorised into the following:

1. Periodontal health and gingival health
  1. Clinical gingival health on an intact periodontium
  2. Clinical gingival health on a reduced periodontium
    1. Stable periodontitis patient
    2. Non-periodontitis patient
2. Gingivitis – dental biofilm-induced
  1. Associated with dental biofilm alone
  2. Mediated by systemic or local risk factors
  3. Drug-influenced gingival enlargement
3. Gingival diseases – non-dental biofilm induced
  1. Genetic/developmental disorders
  2. Specific infections
  3. Inflammatory and immune conditions
  4. Reactive processes
  5. Neoplasms
  6. Endocrine, nutritional & metabolic diseases
  7. Traumatic lesions
  8. Gingival pigmentation

== Prevention ==
Gingivitis can be prevented through regular oral hygiene that includes daily brushing and flossing. Hydrogen peroxide, saline, alcohol or chlorhexidine mouth washes may also be employed. In a 2004 clinical study, the beneficial effect of hydrogen peroxide on gingivitis was highlighted. The use of oscillation-type brushes might reduce the risk of gingivitis compared to manual brushing.

Rigorous plaque control programs along with periodontal scaling and curettage also have proved to be helpful, although according to the American Dental Association, periodontal scaling and root planing are considered as a treatment for periodontal disease, not as a preventive treatment for periodontal disease. In a 1997 review of effectiveness data, the U.S. Food and Drug Administration (FDA) found clear evidence showing that toothpaste containing triclosan was effective in preventing gingivitis. In 2017 the FDA banned triclosan in many consumer products but allowed it to remain in toothpaste because of its effectiveness against gingivitis. In 2019, Colgate, under pressure from health advocates, removed triclosan from the last toothpaste on the market containing it, Colgate Total.

== Treatment ==
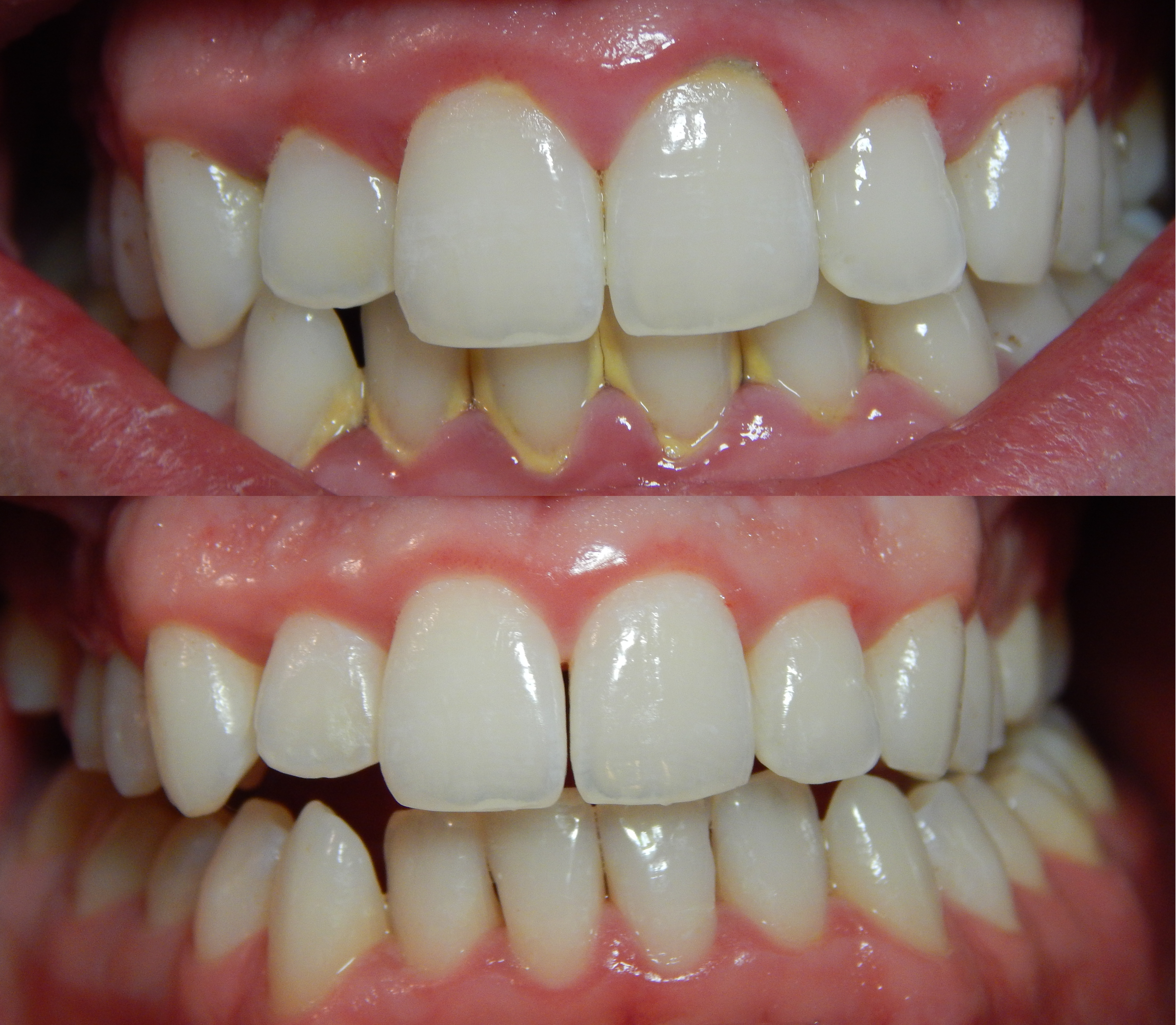
Gingivitis before (top) and after (bottom) a thorough mechanical debridement of the teeth

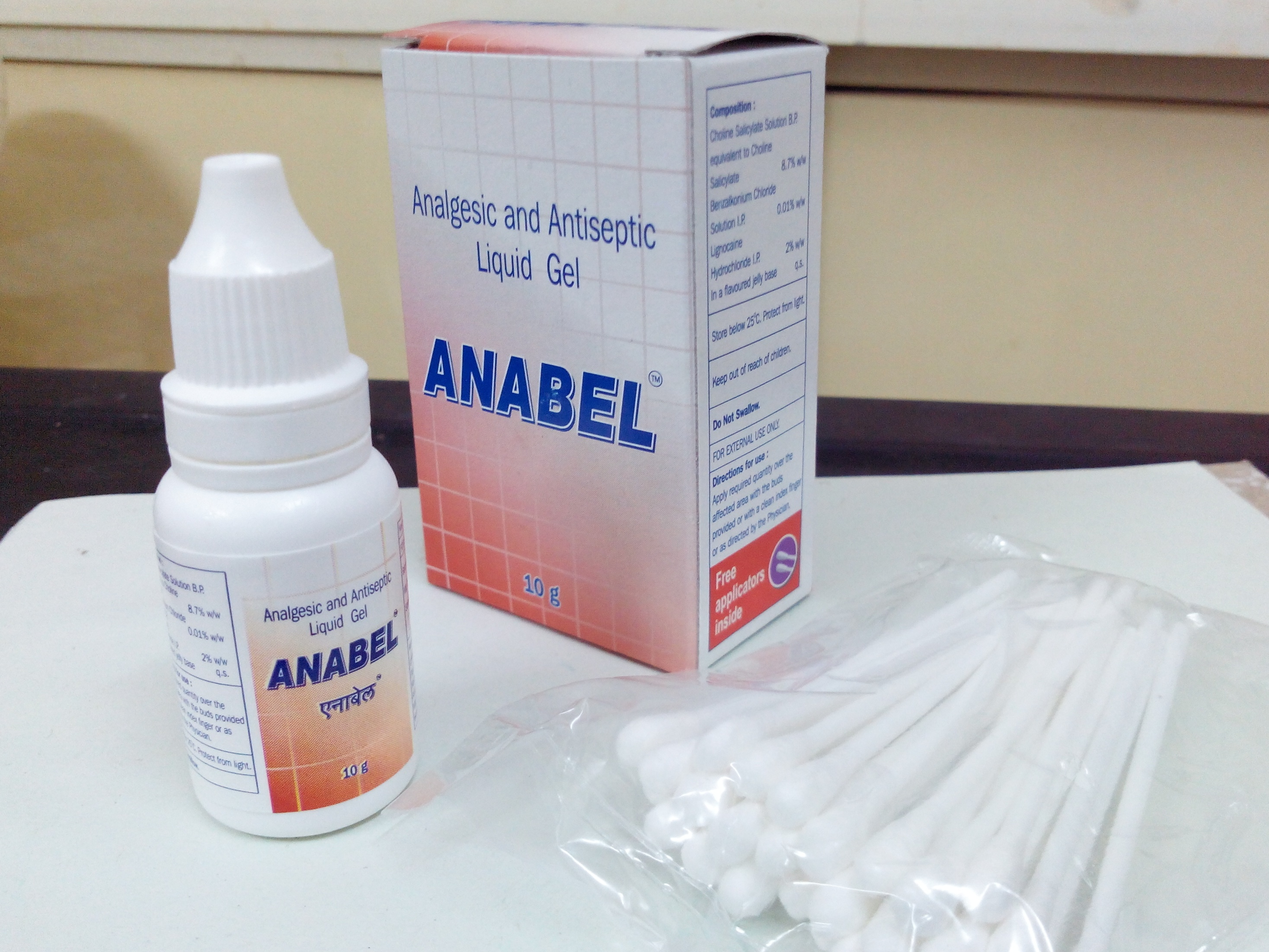
Analgesic and antiseptic gum paint with applicator buds used in treatment of gingivitis

The focus of treatment is to remove plaque. Therapy is aimed at the reduction of oral bacteria and may take the form of regular periodic visits to a dental professional, together with adequate oral hygiene home care. Thus, several of the methods used in the prevention of gingivitis can also be used for the treatment of manifest gingivitis, such as scaling, root planing, curettage, mouth washes containing chlorhexidine or hydrogen peroxide, and flossing. Interdental brushes also help remove any causative agents.

Powered toothbrushes work better than manual toothbrushes in reducing the disease.

The active ingredients that "reduce plaque and demonstrate effective reduction of gingival inflammation over a period of time" are triclosan, chlorhexidine digluconate, and a combination of thymol, menthol, eucalyptol, and methyl salicylate. These ingredients are found in toothpaste and mouthwash. Hydrogen peroxide was long considered a suitable over-the-counter agent to treat gingivitis. There has been evidence to show the positive effect on controlling gingivitis in short-term use. A study indicates that the fluoridated hydrogen peroxide-based mouth rinse can remove teeth stains and reduce gingivitis.

Based on limited evidence, mouthwashes with essential oils may also be useful, as they contain ingredients with anti-inflammatory properties, such as thymol, menthol, and eucalyptol.

The bacteria that cause gingivitis can be controlled by using an oral irrigator daily with a mouthwash containing an antibiotic. Either amoxicillin, cephalexin, or minocycline in 500 grams of a non-alcoholic fluoride mouthwash is an effective mixture.

Overall, intensive oral hygiene care has been shown to improve gingival health in individuals with well-controlled type 2 diabetes. Periodontal destruction is also slowed due to the extensive oral care. Intensive oral hygiene care (oral health education plus supra-gingival scaling) without any periodontal therapy improves gingival health and may prevent progression of gingivitis in well-controlled diabetes.

== See also ==
- Pericoronitis
- "Full width gingivitis" of orofacial granulomatosis
- Desquamative gingivitis
