= Index of oral health and dental articles =

Dental pertains to the teeth, including dentistry. Topics related to the dentistry, the human mouth and teeth include:

== A ==
Abfraction • Abrasion • Academy of General Dentistry • Acinic cell carcinoma • Acrodont • Adalbert J. Volck • Adenomatoid odontogenic tumor • Adhesive Dentistry • Aetna • Agar • Aggregatibacter actinomycetemcomitans • Aim toothpaste • Akers' clasp • Alberta Dental Association and College • Alfred Fones • Alfred P. Southwick • Alginic acid • Alice Timander • Allan G. Brodie • Alveolar bony defects • Alveolar osteitis • Alveolar process of maxilla • Alveolar ridge • Amalgam • Ameloblast • Ameloblastic fibroma • Ameloblastin • Ameloblastoma • Amelogenesis • Amelogenesis imperfecta • Amelogenin • American Academy of Cosmetic Dentistry • American Academy of Periodontology • American Association of Endodontists • American Association of Orthodontists • American Dental Association • American Dental Education Association • American Dental Hygienists' Association • American Society of Dental Surgeons • American Student Dental Association • Amosan • Anbesol • Angular cheilitis • Anodontia • Anthony Hamilton-Smith, 3rd Baron Colwyn • Antoni Cieszyński • Apert syndrome • Apex locator • Aphthous ulcer • Applied kinesiology • Aquafresh • Archwire • Arizona Dental Association • Arm & Hammer • Armin Abron • Articaine • Articulator • Attrition • Australian Dental Association • Automatic toothpaste dispenser

== B ==
Badri Teymourtash • Baltimore College of Dental Surgery • Barbed broach • Barry Cockcroft • Barodontalgia • Bartholomew Ruspini • Baylor College of Dentistry • Ben Harper • Ben Humble • Ben L. Salomon • Benign lymphoepithelial lesion • Bernard J. Cigrand • Bernard Nadler • Bessie Delany • Bill Allen • Bill Emmerson • Bill Osmanski • Billy Cannon • Bioactive glass • Biodontics • Black hairy tongue • Bleeding on probing • Botryoid odontogenic cyst • Brachydont • Brachygnathism • Breath spray • Bridge • Bristol-Myers Squibb • British Dental Association • British Dental Health Foundation • British Dental Students' Association • British Orthodontic Society • Bruxism • Buccal bifurcation cyst • Buccal mucosa • Buccal space

== C ==
CAD/CAM Dentistry • Calcifying epithelial odontogenic tumor • Calcifying odontogenic cyst • Calcium hydroxide • Calculus • California Dental Association • Canadian Association of Orthodontists • Canadian College of Dental Health • Canadian Dental Association • Canalicular adenoma • Canine tooth • Cantilever mechanics • Carbon dioxide laser • Caries vaccine • Carnassial • Case School of Dental Medicine • Cattle age determination • Cemento-osseous dysplasia • Cementoblast • Cementoblastoma • Cementoenamel junction • Cementogenesis • Cementum • Central giant cell granuloma • Central odontogenic fibroma • Central ossifying fibroma • Central Regional Dental Testing Service • Centric relation • Centro Escolar University • CEREC • Cervical loop • Chapin A. Harris • Chapped lips • Charles G. Maurice • Charles Goodall Lee • Charles H. Strub • Charles Murray Turpin • Charles Spence Bate • Charles Stent • Charlie Norwood • Cheilitis • Chewable toothbrush • Chewiness • Chief Dental Officer • Chlorhexidine • Christian Medical and Dental Society • Church and Dwight • Cingulum • Cleft lip and palate • Colgate-Palmolive • Colgate • Commonly used terms of relationship and comparison in dentistry • Concrescence • Condensing osteitis • Configuration factor • Congenital epulis • Consultant Orthodontists Group • Cosmetic dentistry • Crest • Crossbite • Crouzon syndrome • Crown-to-root ratio • Crown • Crown • Crown lengthening • Crunchiness • Curve of spee • Cusp • Cusp of Carabelli

== D ==
Dappen glass • Dan Crane • Darlie • David J. Acer • Deciduous • Deciduous teeth • Delta Dental • Dens evaginatus • Dens invaginatus • Dental-enamel junction • Dental Admission Test • Dental alveolus • Dental amalgam controversy • Dental anatomy • Dental antibiotic prophylaxis • Dental anesthesia • Dental arches • Dental assistant • Dental avulsion • Dental auxiliary • Dental barotrauma • Dental braces • Dental bur • Dental canaliculi • Dental care in adolescent Australians • Dental care of Guantanamo Bay detainees • Dental caries • Dental college • Dental composite • Dental Council of India • Dental cyst • Dental dam • Dental disease • Dental drill • Dental emergency • Dental engine • Dental floss • Dental fluorosis • Dental follicle • Dental hygienist • Dental implant • Dental informatics • Dental instruments • Dental key • Dental Laboratories Association • Dental laboratory • Dental lamina • Dental laser • Dental midline • Dental notation • Dental papilla • Dental pathology • Dental pellicle • Dental phobia • Dental plaque • Dental porcelain • Dental Practitioners' Association • Dental public health • Dental pulp stem cells • Dental radiography • Dental restoration • Dental restorative materials • Dental sealant • Dental spa • Dental subluxation • Dental surgery • Dental syringe • Dental technician • Dental Technologists Association • Dental therapist • Dental trauma • DenTek Oral Care • Dentifrice • Dentigerous Cyst • Dentin • Dentin dysplasia • Dentine bonding agents • Dentine hypersensitivity • Dentinogenesis • Dentinogenesis imperfecta • Dentistry • Dentistry Magazine • Dentistry throughout the world • Dentition • Dentition analysis • Dentrix • Dentures • Denturist • Desquamative gingivitis • Diane Legault • Diastema • Dilaceration • Doc Holliday • Don McLeroy • Donald Leake • Dr. Alban • Dr. Radley Tate • Dr. Tariq Faraj

== E ==
E. Lloyd Du Brul • Eagle syndrome • Early childhood caries • Eastman Kodak • Ed Lafitte • Eco-friendly dentistry • Edentulism • Edward Angle • Edward Hudson (dentist) • Edward Maynard • Egg tooth • Electric toothbrush • Elmex • Elsie Gerlach • Embrasure • Enamel cord • Enamel knot • Enamel lamellae • Enamel niche • Enamel organ • Enamel pearl • Enamel rod • Enamel spindles • Enamel tufts • Enamelin • Endodontic therapy • Endodontics • Epulis fissuratum • Er:YAG laser • Erosion • Eruption cyst • Erythroplakia • Euthymol • Ewald Fabian • Explorer • External resorption • Extraction

== F ==
F. labii inferioris • Faculty of Dental Surgery • Faculty of General Dental Practice • False tooth • Fatima Jinnah Dental College • FDI World Dental Federation • FDI World Dental Federation notation • FDSRCS England • Fiberotomy • Filiform papilla • Fissured tongue • Fixed prosthodontics • Florida Dental Association • Fluoride therapy • Focal infection • Foliate papillae • Forensic dentistry • Frank Abbott (dentist) • Frank Crowther • Frederick B. Moorehead • Frederick Bogue Noyes • Frederick J. Conboy • Free gingival margin • Frenulum linguae • Frey's syndrome • Fungiform papilla

== G ==
G. Walter Dittmar • Gardner's syndrome • Gargling • Gaspard Fauteux • Gene Derricotte • General Dental Council • General Practice Residency • Geographic tongue • Georg Carabelli • George S. Long • Gerald Cardinale • Geriatric dentistry • Gerrit Wolsink • Giant cell fibroma • Gigantiform cementoma • Gingiva • Gingival and periodontal pockets • Gingival cyst of the adult • Gingival cyst of the newborn • Gingival enlargement • Gingival fibers • Gingival sulcus • Gingivectomy • Gingivitis • Giovanni Battista Orsenigo • Glandular odontogenic cyst • Glasgow Dental Hospital and School • Glass ionomer cement • GlaxoSmithKline • Gleem toothpaste • Glennon Engleman • Globulomaxillary cyst • Glossitis • Gnarled enamel • Gnathology • Gold teeth • Goldman School of Dental Medicine • Gomphosis • Göran Lindblad • Government Dental College, Bangalore • Granular cell tumor • Greene Vardiman Black • Gum graft • Gunadasa Amarasekara • Gustatory system

== H ==
Halimeter • Halitosis • Hammaspeikko • Hard palate • Harold Albrecht • Harvard School of Dental Medicine • Head and neck anatomy • Head and neck cancer • Healing of periapical lesions • Henry D. Cogswell • Henry Schein • Henry Trendley Dean • Hertwig's epithelial root sheath • Heterodont • Hexetidine • History of dental treatments • Horace H. Hayden • Horace Wells • Horse teeth • Human tooth development • Hydrodynamic theory (dentistry) • Hyperdontia • Hypocone • Hypodontia • Hypoglossia • Hypsodont

== I ==
I.P. Dental College • Ian Gainsford • Idiopathic osteosclerosis • Implantology • Implant-supported bridge • Impression • Incisor • Inferior alveolar nerve • Inflammatory papillary hyperplasia • Ingestion • Inlays and onlays • Inner enamel epithelium • Interdental brush • Interdental papilla • Interdental plate • Internal resorption • International Association for Dental Research • Interrod enamel • Invisalign • Ipana • Isaac Schour

== J ==
Jack Miller • James Garretson • James W. Holley, III • Jan Boubli • Jim Harrell, Jr. • Jim Lonborg • John Haase • John Smith • Johnson & Johnson • Jon Sudbø • Journal of Periodontology • Journal of the American Dental Association • Julius Franks • Junaid Ismail Dockrat • Junctional epithelium

== K ==
Kalodont • Ken Cranston • Kolynos • Korff fibers

== L ==
Laser diode • Laser scalpel • Lateral periodontal cyst • Lentulo spiral • Lester C. Hunt • Leukoedema • Leukoplakia • Licentiate in Dental Surgery • Lichen planus • Lie bumps • Ligature • Linea alba • Lingual tonsils • Lion • Lip • Lip frenulum piercing • Lip piercing • Lip Reconstruction • List of dental organizations • List of dental schools in Australia • List of dental schools in the United States • List of dentists • List of toothpaste brands • Listerine • Louis Pendleton • Loupe • Low intensity pulsed ultrasound • Lucy Hobbs Taylor • Luting agent

== M ==
Macrodontia • Malocclusion • Mammelon • Mandibular advancement splint • Mandibular canine • Mandibular central incisor • Mandibular first molar • Mandibular first premolar • Mandibular lateral incisor • Mandibular second molar • Mandibular second premolar • Mandibular third molar • Manipal College of Dental Sciences, Manipal • Manipal College of Dental Sciences, Mangalore • Marian Spore Bush • Markus Merk • Martin van Butchell • Mastication • Maury Massler • Maxilla • Maxillary canine • Maxillary central incisor • Maxillary first molar • Maxillary first premolar • Maxillary lateral incisor • Maxillary second molar • Maxillary second premolar • Maxillary third molar • Maximum intercuspation • Median alveolar cyst • Median palatal cyst • Melbourne Faculty of Dentistry • Mentadent • Metacone • Metastatic tumor of jaws • Meth mouth • MFDS • Michael Krop • Micro Surgical Endodontics • Microdontia • Mike Simpson • Miles Dewey Davis, Jr. • Minimal intervention dentistry • Miswak • Molar • Morinosuke Chiwaki • Mouth • Mouth assessment • Mouth breathing • Mouth disease • Mouth mirror • Mouth prop • Mouthguard • Mouthwash • Mucocele • Mucoepidermoid carcinoma • Mucogingival junction • Mucosal lichen planus • Mucous membrane pemphigoid • Mucous retention cyst • MUDH • Mumps • Mutually protected occlusion

== N ==
Nasolabial cyst • Nasopalatine cyst • National Institute of Dental and Craniofacial Research • NBDE • Nd:YAG laser • Neonatal line • Neonatal teeth • Nevus • New York State Dental Association • New York University College of Dentistry • Nicotine stomatitis • Nikolsky's sign • Nobel Biocare • Norman Simmons (biochemist) • Northeast Regional Board of Dental Examiners • Northern Indian Medical & Dental Association of Canada • Northwestern University Dental School

== O ==
Obligate nasal breathing • Occlusal splint • Occlusal trauma • Occlusion • Odontoblast • Odontoblast process • Odontode • Odontogenic keratocyst • Odontogenic myxoma • Odontogenic cyst • Odontoma • Ohaguro • Ohio College of Dental Surgery • Ohio Dental Association • Oil of cloves • Oil pulling • Olaflur • Omega Pharma • Ontario Dental Association • Open Dental • Orabase B • Oral-B • Oral candidiasis • Oral and maxillofacial radiology • Oral and maxillofacial surgery • Oral cancer • Oral hygiene • Oral care swab • Oral irrigator • Oral medicine • Oral microbiology • Oral mucosa • Oral pathology • Oral Surgery • Oral torus • Oral ulcer • Orofacial granulomatosis • Orson Hodge • Orthodontic Facemask & Reverse-Pull Headgear • Orthodontic headgear • Orthodontic spacer • Orthodontic Technicians Association • Orthodontic technology • Orthodontics • Orthopantomogram • Orville Howard Phillips • Oscar Willing • Osseointegrated implant • Osteonecrosis of the jaw • Osteoporotic bone marrow defect • Our Lady of Fatima University • Outer enamel epithelium

== P ==
Painless Parker • Pakistan Medical and Dental Council • Palatal expander • Palate • Palatine uvula • Palmer notation • Parafunctional habit • Parotid gland • Patterson Dental • Paul Beresford • Paul N. Cyr • Pedodontics • Pemphigus • Peninsula College of Medicine and Dentistry • Pennsylvania College of Dental Surgery • Pepsodent • Periapical abscess • Periapical cyst • Pericoronitis • Perikyma • Periodontal curette • Periodontal ligament • Periodontal probe • Periodontal scaler • Periodontitis • Periodontitis as a manifestation of systemic disease • Periodontium • Periodontology • Peripheral giant-cell granuloma • Peripheral odontogenic fibroma • Peripheral ossifying fibroma • Permanent teeth • Peter Kunter • Peutz–Jeghers syndrome • Piercing • Phil Samis • Philip A. Traynor • Philip Blaiberg • Philtrum • Pierre Corbeil • Pierre Fauchard • Pink tooth of Mummery • Pleomorphic adenoma • Pleurodont • Plica fimbriata • Polk E. Akers • Polymorphous low-grade adenocarcinoma • Polynoxylin • Polyvinyl siloxane • Post-canine megadontia • Post and core • Posterior tongue • Potassium alginate • Premolar • Preparation • Primordial cyst • Procaine • Procter & Gamble • Prognathism • Prosthodontics • Protocone • Pulp • Pulp polyp • Pyogenic granuloma

== Q ==
Quad Helix

== R ==
Rabab Fetieh • Radial composite deviation • Radioactive dentin abrasion • Ragas Dental College • Raman Bedi • Randy Starr • Ranula • Receding gums • Reduced enamel epithelium • Regenerative endodontics • Regional odontodysplasia • Removable partial denture • Retainer • Retromolar space • Riggs' disease • Robert Blake • Roberto Calderoli • Rod sheath • Rodrigues Ottolengui • Roger Bailey • Root canal • Root End Surgery • Root resorption • Royal Australasian College of Dental Surgeons • Royal College of Dental Surgeons of Ontario • Royal College of Dentists • Royal College of Surgeons of England

== S ==
Saint Apollonia • Salivary gland • Samir Ghawshah • Samuel Bemis • Samuel Cartwright • Scaling and root planing • Schulich School of Medicine & Dentistry • Scope • Secondary palate • Segmental odontomaxillary dysplasia • Sheila Faith • Shovel-shaped incisors • Sialogram • Signal • Simon Hullihen • Sinodonty and Sundadonty • Sinus-lift procedure • Smiley's Good Teeth Puppet Theatre • Socket preservation • Sodium alginate • Soft palate • SoftDent • SOHP • Sonicare • Southern Regional Testing Agency • Sozodont • Speech organ • Squamous odontogenic tumor • Stafne defect • Stan Brown • Stanley D. Tylman • Stanley McInnis • Stannous fluoride • Stellate reticulum • Sten Forshufvud • Steve Green • Stippling • Stomatol • Stomatology • Stratum intermedium • Straumann • Striae of Retzius • Sublingual gland • Submandibular gland • Sulcular epithelium • :Superior alveolar artery • Superior mouth • Supernumerary roots • Swedish Dental Association • Sydney Faculty of Dentistry

== T ==
Talon cusp • Taste • Taste bud • Taurodontism • Teeth cleaning • Teething • Teledentistry • Temporary crown • Temporary restoration • Temporomandibular joint • Temporomandibular joint disorder • Thaddeus Weclew • Thomas Berdmore • Thomas Bramwell Welch • Tim Whatley • Tom's of Maine • Tom Slade • Tomes' process • Tongue • Tongue cleaner • Tongue diseases • Tongue piercing • Tongue scraper • Tongue thrust • Tonsillolith • Tooth • Tooth-friendly • Tooth abscess • Tooth bleaching • Tooth brushing • :Tooth development • Tooth enamel • Tooth eruption • Tooth fusion • Tooth gemination • Tooth loss • Tooth painting • Tooth polishing • Tooth regeneration • Tooth squeeze • Tooth Tunes • Toothache • Toothbrush • Toothpaste • Toothpick • Torus mandibularis • Torus palatinus • Traumatic bone cyst • Traumatic neuroma • Treatment of knocked-out (avulsed) teeth • Trench mouth • Treponema denticola • Trigeminal ganglion • Trismus • Tuftelin • Tufts University School of Dental Medicine • Turner's hypoplasia • Twin bloc • Typodont

== U ==
UCLA School of Dentistry • Ultra Brite • Unilever • Universal numbering system • University of Illinois at Chicago College of Dentistry • University of Pennsylvania School of Dental Medicine • University of Pittsburgh School of Dental Medicine • University of Tennessee College of Dentistry • University of the East College of Dentistry • University of Toronto Faculty of Dentistry

== V ==
Veneer • Vermillion border • Vertical dimension of occlusion • Vestibular lamina

== W ==
Walter Koskiusko Waldowski • Warthin's tumor • Water fluoridation • Water fluoridation controversy • Western Regional Examining Board • Weston Price • White sponge nevus • Whitening strips • Wilbur Wonka • William Donald Kelley • William Duff • William Gibson • William Samuel Hall • William T.G. Morton • Wisdom teeth

== X ==
Xerogel • Xylophagia • Xerostomia

== Z ==
Zane Grey • Zinc oxide eugenol

== See also ==
- List of toothpaste brands
