= List of dental organizations in the United States =

This is a list of dental organizations in the United States.

== National ==
- Academy for Sports Dentistry
- Academy of General Dentistry
- Academy of Operative Dentistry
- Academy of Interdisciplinary Dentofacial Therapy
- Academy of Laser Dentistry
- Academy of Osseointegration
- Alpha Omega fraternity
- American Academy of Cosmetic Dentistry
- American Academy of Craniofacial Pain
- American Academy of Dental Hygiene
- American Academy of Dental Practice Administration
- American Academy of Esthetic Dentistry
- American Academy of Facial Esthetics
- American Academy of Fixed Prosthodontics
- American Academy of Implant Dentistry
- American Academy of Implant Prosthodontics
- American Academy of Maxillofacial Prosthetics
- American Academy of Orofacial Pain
- American Academy of Pediatric Dentistry
- American Academy of Periodontology
- American Academy of Restorative Dentistry
- American Academy of the History of Dentistry
- American Academy for Oral Systemic Health
- American Association for Dental Research
- American Association of Endodontists
- American Association of Oral and Maxillofacial Surgeons
- American Association of Oral Biologists
- American Association of Orthodontists
- American Association of Public Health Dentistry
- American Board of Forensic Odontology
- American Cleft Palate-Craniofacial Association
- American College of Dentists
- American College of Forensic Examiners
- American College of Prosthodontics
- American Dental Assistants Association
- American Dental Association
- American Dental Education Association
- American Dental Hygienists' Association
- American Dental Society of Anesthesiology
- American Equilibration Society
- American Orthodontic Society
- American Society for Dental Aesthetics
- American Society of Dental Anesthesiologists
- American Society of Forensic Odontology
- American Society for Geriatric Dentistry
- American Student Dental Association
- American Veterinary Dental Society
- Arizona State University Pre-Dental Organization
- Association of Managed Care Providers
- Certified Dentists Internationale
- Charles Tweed Foundation
- Committee on Dental Auxiliaries
- Dental Anthropology Association
- Dental Assisting National Board
- Federation of Special Care Dentistry Association
- Hispanic Dental Association
- Journal of Esthetic and Restorative Dentistry
- National Dental Association
- National Institute of Dental and Craniofacial Research
- Society of American Indian Dentists
- United States Navy Dental Corps

== States ==
- California Society of Pediatric Dentists
- California Society of Pediatric Dentists
- California Society of Periodontists
- Colegio de Cirujanos Dentistas de Puerto Rico
- Connecticut State Dental Association
- Florida Dental Association
- Kansas Dental Board
- Massachusetts Dental Society
- New York State Dental Association
- New York State Academy of General Dentistry
- New York State Dental Foundation
- Ohio Dental Association
- Texas State Board of Dental Examiners

== Others ==
- Christian Medical and Dental Associations
- Delta Sigma Delta
- Psi Omega
- United States Navy Dental Corps
