= Maury Massler =

Maury Massler (1912-1990) was a pioneer in developing two dental specialty areas.

He established the Department of Pediatric Dentistry at the University of Illinois at Chicago College of Dentistry, serving as head of the department from 1946 to 1965. A prolific researcher, he co-authored two textbooks, contributed to four others, and published more than 275 papers in scientific journals. Along with Isaac Schour, he created a chart of tooth development. He was a renowned expert on abnormal tooth development. Dr. Massler shared his expertise with the world, serving as a visiting professor and consultant in Italy, Germany, South America, India, Australia, Scandinavia, South Africa, and Israel. Massler was one of the creators of the Tel Aviv University postgraduate dentistry program.

After retiring from the UIC College of Dentistry in 1973, he joined Tufts University, where he developed Tufts' geriatric dentistry program.

He was a founder and early president of the American Academy of Pediatric Dentistry.

Massler and his wife, Hilde, had two daughters.
