= Condensing =

Condensing may refer to:

- Condensation
- Condensing steam locomotive
- Condensing boiler
- Condensing osteitis
