= Idiopathic osteosclerosis =

Hardening of the teeth roots for an unknown reason

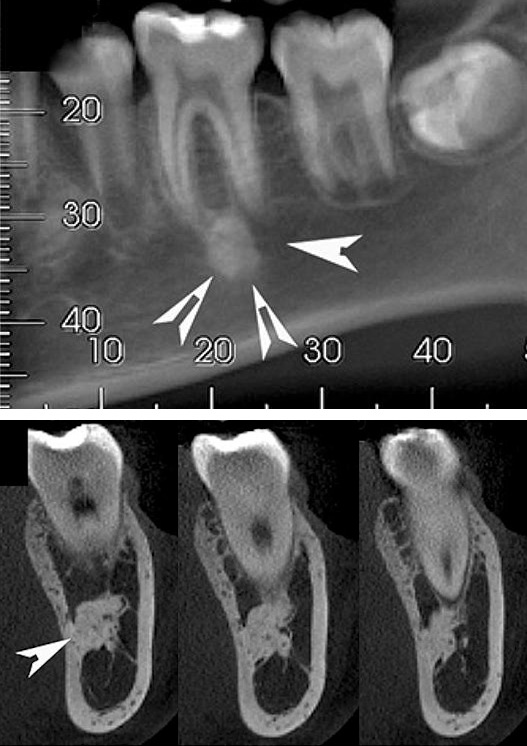
- Top: A hyperdense round lesion located under the apex of a non-infected tooth. Bottom: The lesion is separated from the root of the adjacent tooth by a visible periodontal membrane.
- Specialty: Dentistry

Idiopathic osteosclerosis, also known as enostosis or dense bone island, is a condition which may be found around the roots of a tooth, usually a premolar or molar. It is usually painless and found during routine radiographs as an amorphous radiopaque (light) area around a tooth. There is no sign of inflammation of the tooth, and if the island is associated with the root the periodontal ligament space is preserved.

== Signs and symptoms ==
Focal radiodensity of the jaw which is not inflammatory, dysplastic, neoplastic or a manifestation of a systemic disease. This is common and affects 5% of the population, usually seen in teens and those in their 20s. Typically asymptomatic and is an incidental finding on a radiograph, found anywhere in the jaw, most commonly in the mandibular premolar-molar region. The shape ranges from round to linear streaks to occasional angular forms.

== Cause ==
Mostly unknown (idiopathic), but may be a reaction to past trauma or infection which is difficult to rule out in some cases.

== Diagnosis ==
Usual diagnosis is via radiograph, patient history, biopsy is rarely needed. Periodic follow ups should included additional radiographs that show minimal growth or regression.

=== Radiology ===
Well defined, rounded or triangular radiodensity, that is uniformly opaque. There is no lucent component. Found near the root apex or in the inter-radicular area. Root resorption and tooth movement are rare. If it blends into bone cortices, it does so with no expansion or thinning.

=== Differential diagnosis ===
Condensing osteitis, sclerosing osteomyelitis, enostosis cementoblastoma, cemento-osseous dysplasia, hypercementosis, exostoses (tori). Condensing osteitis may resemble idiopathic osteosclerosis, however, associated teeth will have pulpitis or pulpal necrosis with condensing osteitis.

These features help differentiate idiopathic osteosclerosis from similar entities such as condensing osteitis, cemento-osseous dysplasia, hypercementosis, and cementoblastoma.

== Treatment ==
No treatment is necessary.
