= Euthymol =

Brand of fluoride-free toothpaste

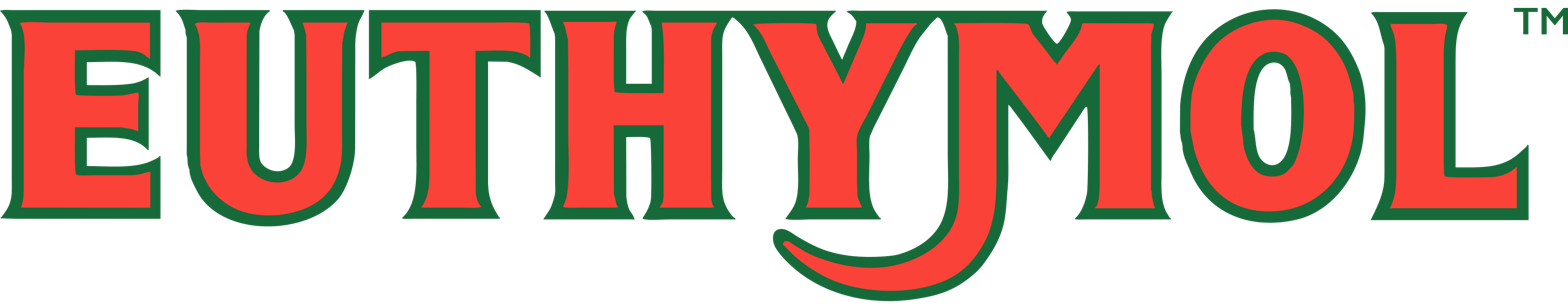
- Euthymol logo
- Product type: Oral hygiene
- Current owner: LG H&H
- Country: England, United Kingdom
- Introduced: 1898; 128 years ago
- Markets: Worldwide
- Website: euthymolbrand.com

Euthymol is a British brand of antiseptic toothpaste formulated without parabens in a fluoride and fluoride-free range that is distributed by LG H&H.

The original, sensitive and whitening variety is characterized by its distinctive bright pink colour, strong herbal flavor, and medicinal taste. The product is also notable for its vintage-style metal tube packaging, which features a design with only a pattern and the product name. It is marketed as helping to remove plaque, support enamel health, and provide breath-freshening benefits.

== History ==
The brand was first launched around 1898 in the United Kingdom and was initially marketed by Parke, Davis & Co. as far back as 1896, and as well as toothpaste it was sold as a variety of antiseptic powders and creams, which contained thymol, oil of wintergreen, menthol, eucalyptus oil, boric acid and indigo, though modern formulations only contain the first three of those ingredients (amongst other things).

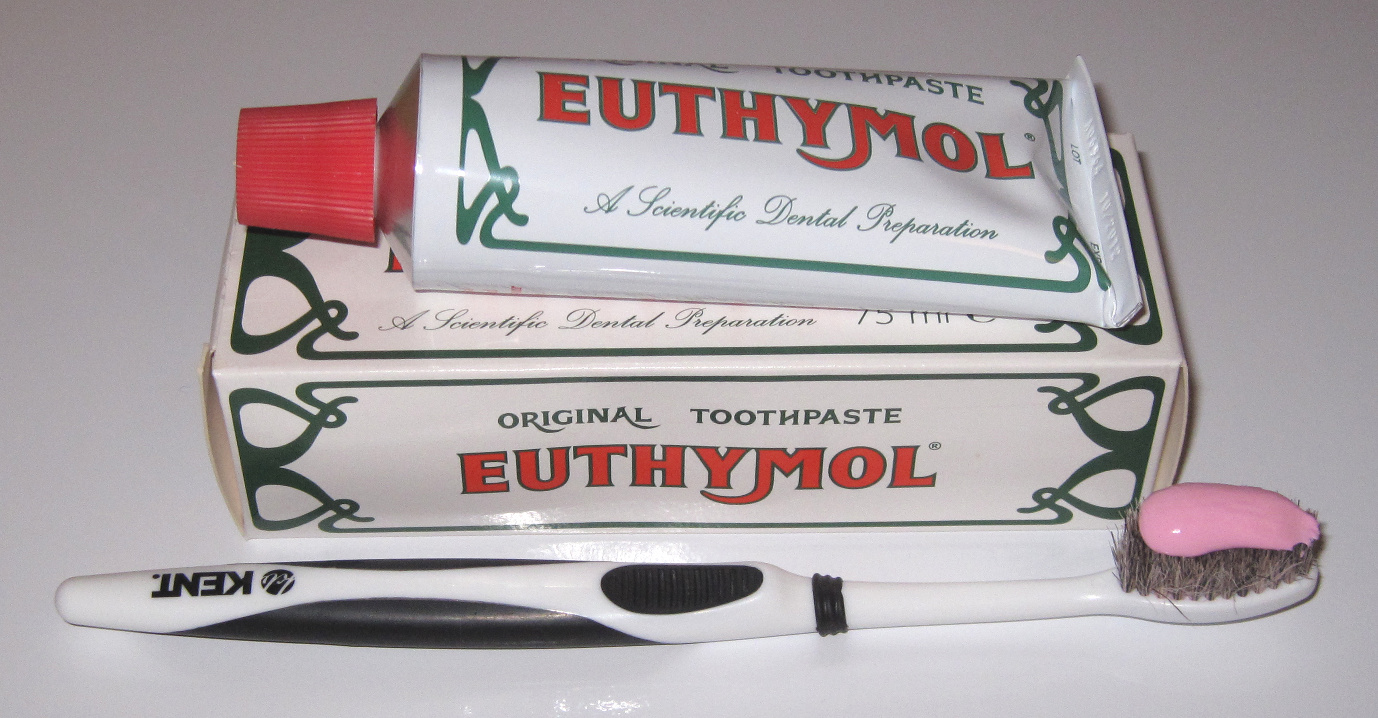
Euthymol toothpaste

The name Euthymol is a portmanteau of the words eucalyptus and thymol, which were the active ingredients of the original formulation.

The supply of Euthymol toothpaste was temporarily interrupted in mid-2013 while the product was reformulated due to changes in the European Cosmetics Regulation. The new formulation of Euthymol was released to supply chains in January 2014 and was available in stores in February 2014.

== Product line ==
The range is as follows:

- Original (fluoride-free)
- Sensitive
- Whitening
- Whitening Purple Corrector

The brands most recent toothpaste launched was the Whitening Purple Corrector in June 2026 and has a deep violet-purple colour.

== Market Presence ==
Euthymol is marketed in Europe, Asia, and North America, including countries such as the United Kingdom, France, Germany, the United States, South Korea, and Japan.

The product can be purchased through various retail channels including drugstores, pharmacies, and select beauty stores.

Euthymol on the UK market is currently produced in South Korea.

== See also ==
- List of toothpaste brands
- Index of oral health and dental articles
