= Ohio Dental Association =

- Formation: 1866
- Type: Professional association
- Headquarters: Columbus, Ohio
- Location: United States
- Website: www.oda.org

The Ohio Dental Association (ODA) is an organization that was established in 1866.

Its membership is made up of approximately eighty percent of dentists in Ohio.

== Purpose ==
The aims of the ODA are to improve oral hygiene and strengthen dentistry in Ohio.

These aims are achieved by:

- improving dental team skills.
- providing resources to advance the dental profession.
- increasing public and professional oral hygiene knowledge.

== Programs ==
- Smiles for Seniors: an oral health program designed to assist dental professionals in working with the needs of seniors. It is also used by state and local agencies to determine what health care seniors need. It is funded by the American Dental Association Foundation and GlaxoSmithKline.
- Dental OPTIONS: a program funded jointly by the ODA and the Ohio Department of Health to provide low income families and individuals with dental services at reduced fees.
- Operation TACTIC: this is a program that is designed to raise awareness in the dangers of tobacco for youth. Materials are provided by the ODA to people willing to participate.
- Give Kids A Smile! Day: This is an annual event to raise awareness and promote dental health in children.

== See also ==
- California Dental Association
