= Oral torus =

Disorder of the jaw

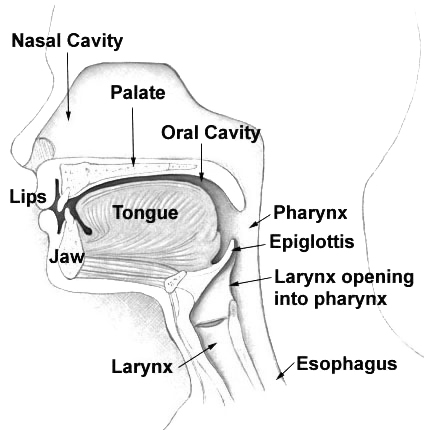
Head and neck anatomy

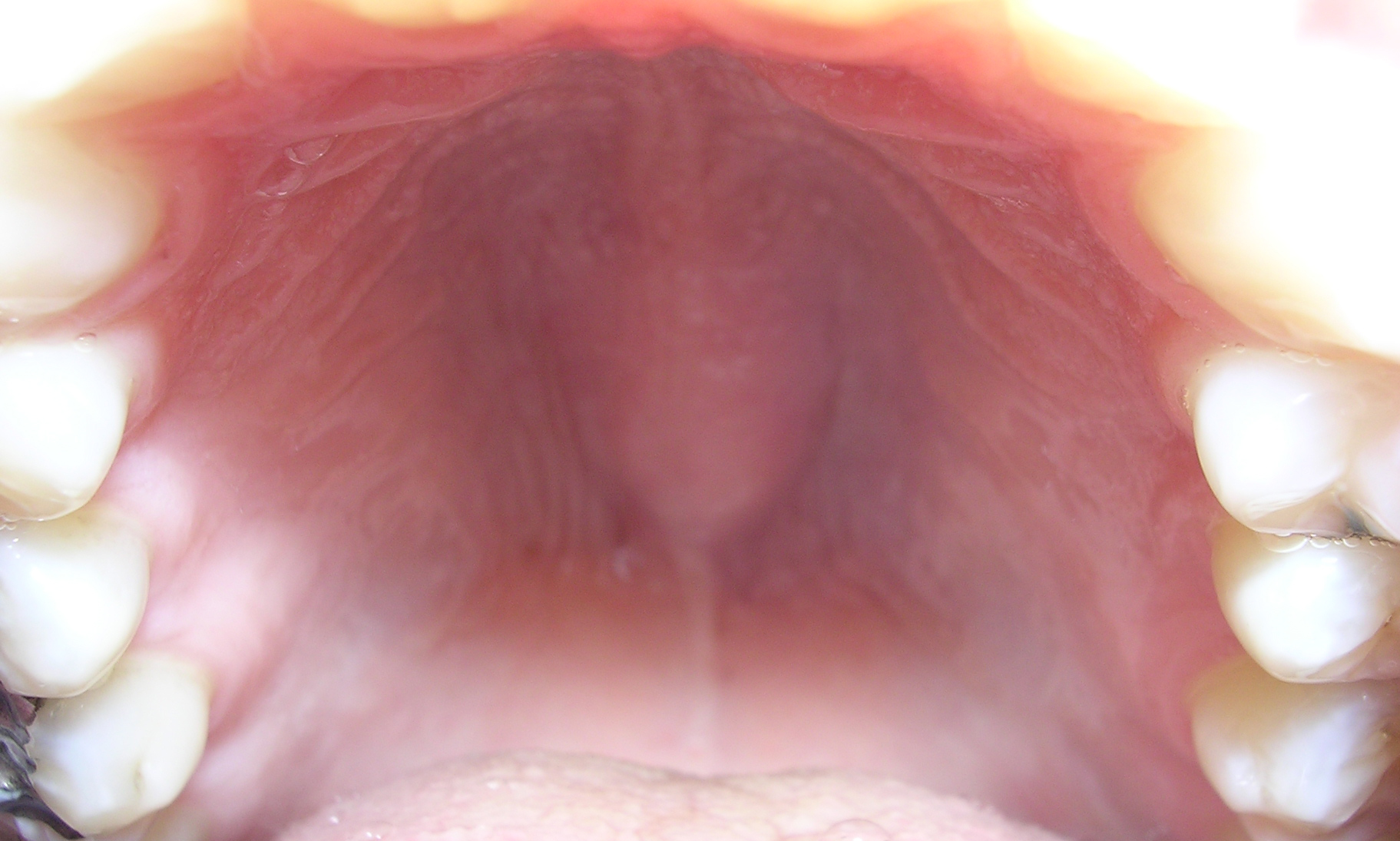
Torus Palatinus (torus of the hard palate - roof of the mouth)

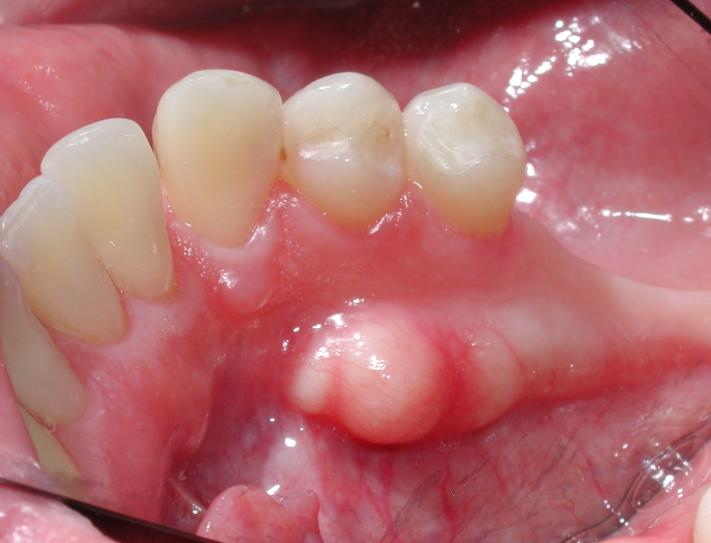
Mandibular Torus, right side (torus underneath the tongue)

An oral torus - also known as: dental torus - is an oral condition in which bony growth occurs in the mouth; there are three locations in which oral tori may appear: the hard palate (torus palatinus), in the lower jaw underneath the tongue (mandibular torus), and/or on the back or upper gums near the cheeks (buccal exostoses). While the growth is bony and hard at these locations, they are usually harmless and painless, so treatment is not required to treat this condition. However, while usually harmless and painless, oral tori may start to interfere with an individual's speech, swallowing, other functions, or dental procedures (in these circumstances, treatment is necessary).

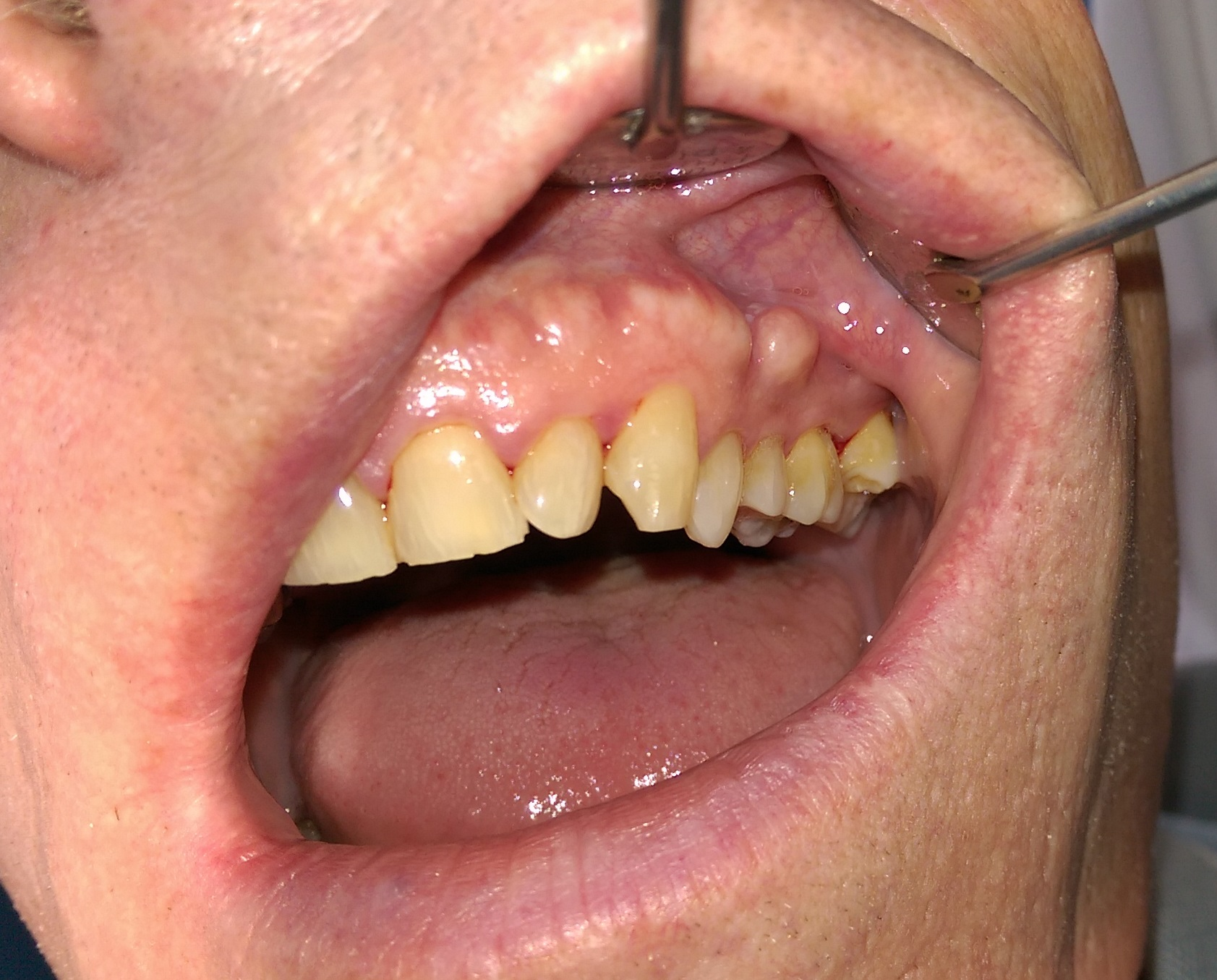
Buccal Exostoses (torus on the upper gums, near the cheeks)

These bony growths can vary in size and appear in groups; their size may also fluctuate throughout an individual's life. Some people are born with this condition while others may develop it—the growth is usually slow in these cases and some individuals do not notice when they occur due to them being asymptomatic.

Occurrences of tori are more frequent in women than in men. Tori are associated with adulthood and rarely appear before the age of 15. The palatal version of tori have a higher occurrence in Native American and Inuit populations.

Treatment is not necessary unless they become an obstruction to chewing or prosthetic appliances.

== Signs & symptoms ==
Most individuals may not realize they have oral tori until a dental examination because they have no symptoms.

In the case there is painless symptoms they include:

- one or more bony growths at one or more locations of the mouth (palatines, mandibular, buccal)
- difficulty chewing or dysphagia
- speech difficulties, such as slurred speech (due to the tongue being affected)
- difficulty fitting dental appliances within the mouth
- sore jaw

Symptoms that in cases where the oral tori requires treatment include:

- pain or discomfort (especially due to large tori)
- trouble closing the mouth
- gingivitis or bleeding (due to the growth causing friction between the gums or food getting trapped around the growths)
- loose teeth
- throat pain
- tenderness in the affected location

== Causes ==
There are a combination of factors that may lead to the development of oral tori. These factors (or causes) are due to:

- genetics (believed to be through autosomal dominance)
- bone density (individuals with higher bone density may be prone to development of oral tori)
- vitamin deficiencies (such as Vitamin D and calcium)
- teeth grinding, known as: bruxism (this may cause pressure on the jaw bone which can result in excess bone growth)
- diet (including diet too low in calcium or too high in calcium)
- mouth anatomy (such as malocclusion)
- local stressors or trauma
- age (with people over the age of 30 being more prone to tori development)

These factors may vary depending on the location of the oral tori or how severe this condition occurs in an individual.

== Pathophysiology or mechanisms ==
The exact pathophysiology or mechanisms of oral tori is not completely understood and this is believed to be due to a combination of different genetic and environmental factors.

Oral tori due to genetics is believed to be inherited in an autosomal dominant way (indicating that the gene affecting the individual is on one of the non-sex chromosomes - "autosomal" - and that the single copy of the affected gene from either parent - "dominant" - is enough to cause the mutation in an individual); however, it is also seen that environmental factors have been associated in the development of more complex etiology than just genetics alone. Bone density factors may be due to the fact that individuals with higher bone density may be prone to development of oral tori. Vitamin deficiencies such as Vitamin D and calcium along with a diet that is too high or too low in calcium may induce the development of the oral tori due to bones needing calcium for growth. Teeth grinding, known as: bruxism, may cause pressure on the jaw bone which can result in excess bone growth.

== Diagnosis ==
Diagnosis of oral tori are usually done during a dental examination by a dentist or a specialist in dentistry. The bony growth may be recognized during dental procedures, cleanings, or just regular check-ups.

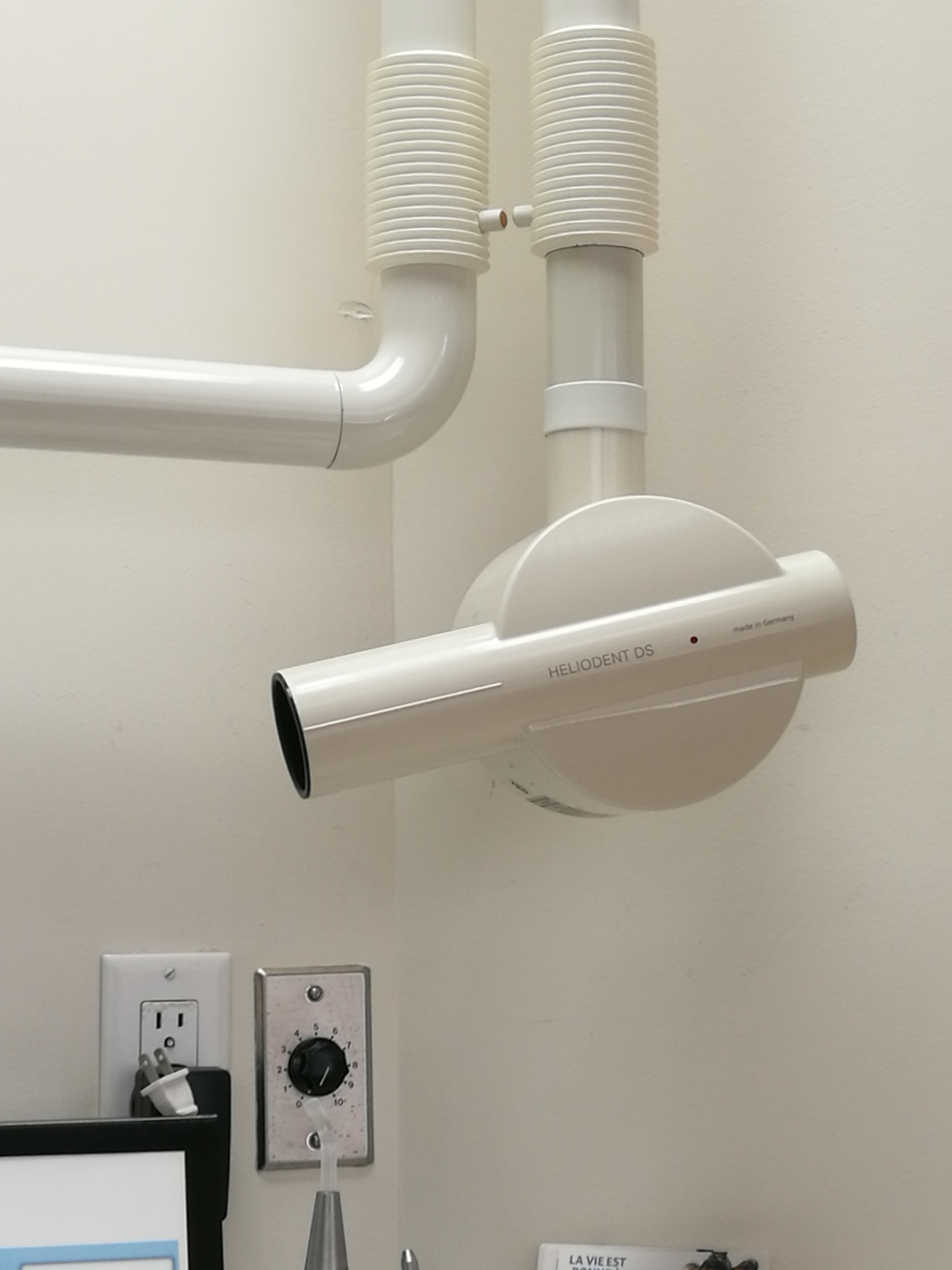
Dental X-Ray Unit

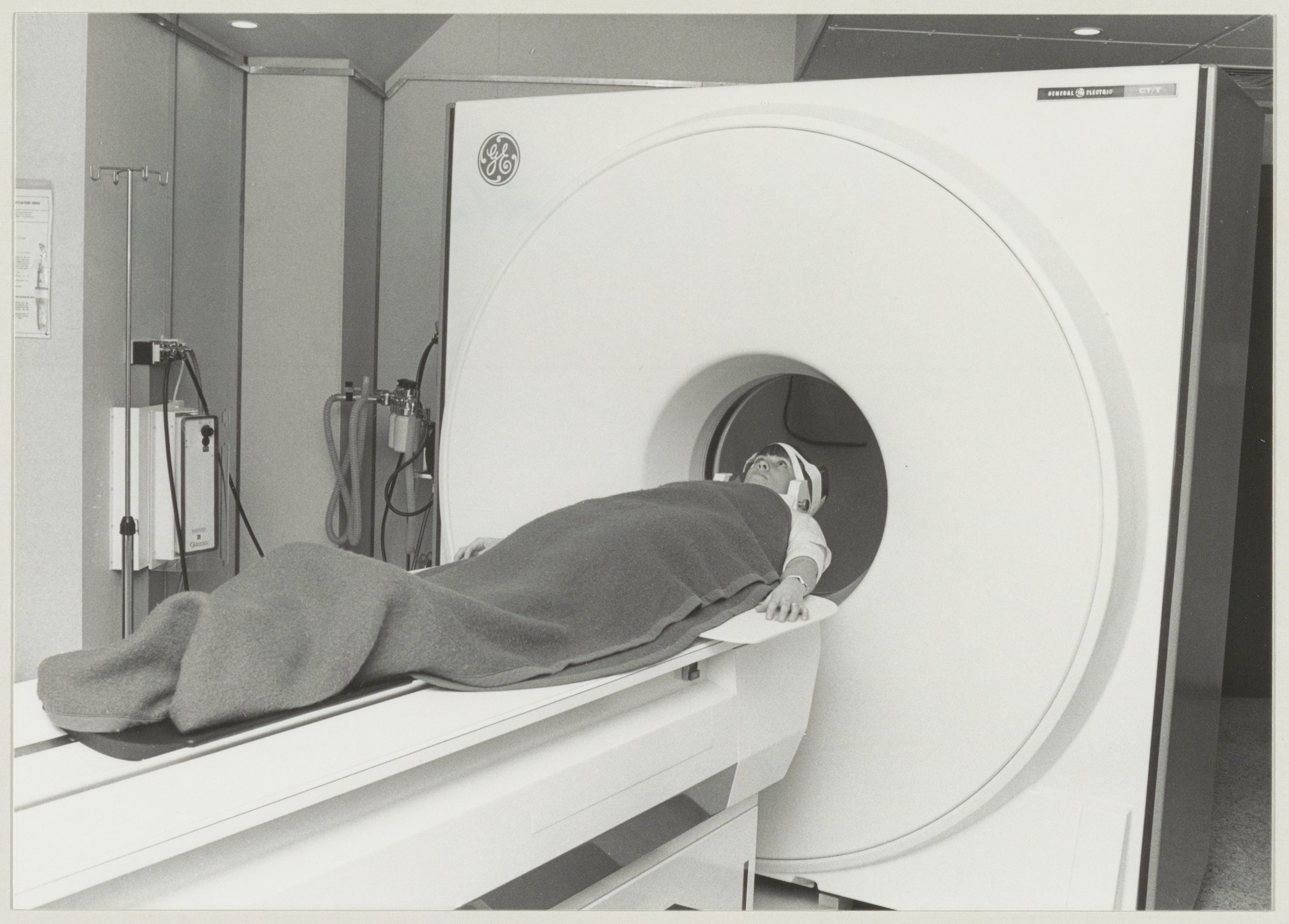
CT Scan

During a routine exam, the dentist may be able to diagnosis this condition through a visual examination by inspecting the mouth for any irregularities such as bony growths. The dentist during this visual exam will focus on the palate, lingual side of the lower jaw, and the outer areas of the upper and lower jaws. Once visual examination indicates an oral torus, the dentist will then feel for palpation in the suspect area in order to further examine the size, shape, and firmness of the oral tori. Though imaging is not necessary to diagnose oral tori, the dentist may decide to do imaging to rule out cysts or tumors (which may cause similar symptoms or have similar factors) by taking an x-ray (for a 2D view) or CT scan (for a 3D view) of the mouth to get a better view of the exact size and location of the growth.

== Treatment or management ==
Due to oral tori being benign (meaning it is harmless and painless), treatment is not required since many individuals do not have symptoms - and do not even realize they have this condition until told by a dentist - so there is no interference in quality of life or daily functions. Patients with oral tori may be told to monitor their condition to ensure no changes occur or symptoms develop. However, in the situation where the oral tori is painful, disrupting with daily activities, or interfering with quality of life, treatment is needed.

When treatment is necessary, the main treatment is oral surgery (known as: tori removal or exostosis removal). This procedure is done by an oral surgeon giving a localized anesthetic to numb the gums or affected area (in some cases to make a patient more comfortable and calm, the oral surgeon may offer sedation dentistry options); following the anesthetic, the surgeon will then make an incision in the gums or affected area in order to access the tori, and then surgically remove the tori along with any excess bone. The surgeon will then stitch the site of incision; these sutures will begin to dissolve within about 5–10 days after the surgery (in some cases, they may fall out early but this is usually not a call for concern).

While rare, complications following a tori removal may include:

- excessive bleeding
- infection
- swelling that lasts for more than a couple days
- (rarely) an allergic reaction to the anesthetic

== Prognosis ==
As mentioned in the Causes section, oral tori may be due to a combination of genetic and environmental factors along with individual habits or lifestyle.

Oral tori does not change life-expectancy of an affected individual and usually does not result in any interferences to quality of life or life activities. In the case of symptom development, an individual may go to a dental surgeon or dentist for insight or for possible removal. While removal of oral tori is effective in lessening any symptoms that may have arose, there are rare cases in which they may grow back - however, this may be due to other underlying problems, genetics, or older age.

== Epidemiology ==
The prevalence of oral tori varies widely within different populations, with racial differences appearing significant - with high prevalence within the Native American and Inuit populations. There is also reported differences between genders.

Oral tori prevalence also widely varies depending on the type present within individuals.

- Torus Palatinus affects 20-30% of the general population with it being more common in women.
- Mandibular Tori affects about 27 out of every 1,000 adults in the United States alone; however, it is less common than palatine tori.
- Buccal Exostoses widely varies from 0.09% to nearly 19% based on different studies, due to the different populations studied and diagnostic criteria used in each different study.

== Research direction ==
While the majority of cases of oral tori are harmless, asymptomatic, and usually found during a dental examination or check-up by accident, recent research has found that there are rare cases in which oral tori can become infected, leading to osteomyelitis, especially in individuals who experience trauma to the oral cavity, individuals who have poor oral hygiene, individuals who have uncontrolled diabetes, and/or individuals who have comprised immune systems (especially related to autoimmune disorders or autoimmune dysfunction). This osteomyelitis related to oral tori is known as "osteomyelitis of tori."

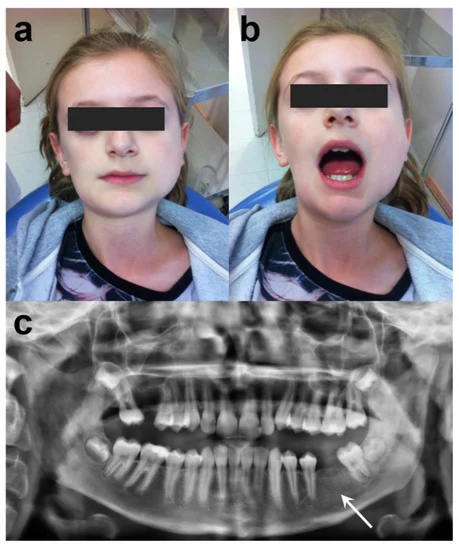
Facial swelling and infection due to Osteomyelitis of Tori

In the cases where osteomyelitis of tori occurs, treatment and management of this condition are adjusted. Instead of a scheduled oral surgery in regular cases where oral tori begin to cause discomfort or symptoms, the patient with osteomyelitis of tori requires prompt medical attention; a patient with this condition must be given intravenous antibiotics and anti-inflammatory drugs, (in some cases) receive a biopsy of the suspected or infected area, and receive surgery and management from an oral and maxillofacial surgeon. This is because osteomyelitis is an inflammatory process of bone and bone marrow which is caused by an infectious organism(s) which result in local bone destruction. These infections can vary from acute to chronic, with acute conditions being sudden and severe and chronic developing slowly and persistently.

While the prevalence of osteomyelitis of tori is very rare, it has recently been found possible related to oral tori, and due to its possibility and contributions to existing literature and research related to oral tori, this rare condition of oral tori serves many insights which may enhance the preventative practices of oral tori before it can result in osteomyelitis of tori. The existence and awareness of this condition is also vital for general dentists—and not just oral surgeons—in being able to recognize in order to be able to give proper care, attention, and monitoring to the affected area before it can become infected because osteomyelitis of tori can occur even in cases where oral tori is originally asymptomatic before having an acute onset, which is essential in preventative care.
