= Alberta Dental Association and College =

- Predecessor: Northwest Territories Act
- Established: 1906
- Type: Regulatory college / dental association
- Region served: Province of Alberta
- Formerly called: Alberta Dental Association (used before 2001)

The Alberta Dental Association and College (ADA&C) gives leadership to the dental profession on professional regulations and member services. It provides the public with information and services, to ensure that Albertans receive safe, appropriate, ethical and quality dental care as an integral part of general health.

== History ==
The ADA&C is a regulatory college which was established in 1906, after the formation of the Province of Alberta. It was called the Alberta Dental Association before 2001. Prior to 1906, the dental profession was regulated by the Northwest Territories Act.

== Code of Ethics ==
Each dentist practicing in the Province of Alberta is required to follow the Code of Ethics.
