= Akers' clasp =

The Akers' clasp is a circumferential direct retainer used in removable partial dentures, consisting of an occlusal rest, a guide plate, a retentive arm that engages a measured undercut on the abutment tooth, and a reciprocal arm on the opposing surface that provides stabilization.

It is generally considered the clasp of choice for tooth-supported partial dentures, where abutment teeth on both sides of the edentulous area can resist vertical dislodging forces without transferring excessive torque to the supporting tissues. Because it approaches the undercut from an occlusal direction, the design is relatively simple to fabricate as a single cast unit and provides predictable retention when the abutment offers a measurable buccal or lingual undercut, typically in the 0.25 to 0.50 mm range. Retentive force diminishes with repeated insertion and removal cycles, and excessive undercut depth or overly stiff alloy can lead to clasp deformation or enamel damage, factors that drive material selection between cast and wrought-wire arms.

The design is named for Polk E. Akers, an American dentist credited with its description, and remains the foundational reference clasp from which several variants including the reverse Akers, the RPA (rest, proximal plate, Akers) clasp, and combination clasps are derived.
