= Sozodont =

Former dental hygiene product

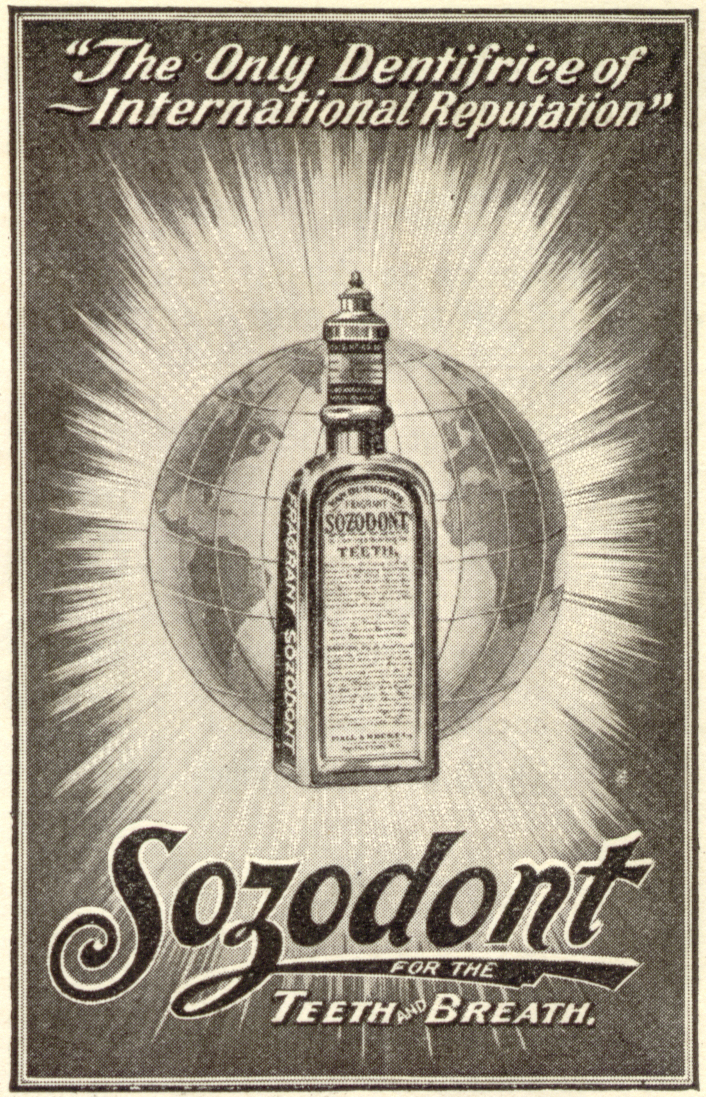
A circa 1900 Sozodont print advertisement showing a standard bottle of the product

Sozodont was a popular brand of oral hygiene product from the mid-nineteenth century to the early twentieth century.

Created in 1859 by druggist Roswell van Buskirk (circa 1824–1902) of New Jersey, it derived its name from the Greek sozo, meaning "to preserve, keep safe", and the stem odont-, meaning "tooth, teeth". Sozodont was later manufactured by the firm Hall & Ruckel of New York, New York, and London, England. Known as Van Buskirk's Fragrant Sozodont, or Van Buskirk's Fragrant and Antiseptic Sozodont, the product was dispensed from a glass bottle through a metal sprinkler and, as illustrated advertisements show, could be applied to the teeth using a toothbrush. The product made strong use of advertising as a marketing tool and by the late nineteenth century was an established household word.

== Ingredients ==
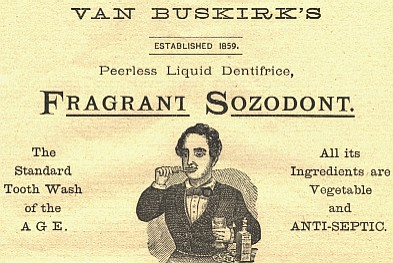
A 19th-century Sozodont ad (detail)

According to an 1889 issue of the journal American Druggist, Sozodont was made from a liquid and powder mixture. The powder contained orris root, carbonate of calcium, and magnesia. The liquid contained castile soap (soap made exclusively from vegetable oil), glycerin, sizeable portions of water and alcohol, and, for flavoring, a small quantity of oil of peppermint, clover, cinnamon, and star anise, as well as, for coloring, cochineal (a dye made from an insect of the same name).

== Advertising claims ==
Its manufacturers claimed that Sozodont would clean and preserve the teeth and harden the gums, as well as "impart a delightfully refreshing taste and feeling to the mouth." In addition, claimed promotional material, "it prevents the accumulation of tartar on the teeth and arrests the progress of decay."

Furthermore, cartons of the product maintained that, in addition to the above, Sozodont was "Recommended by many of the most prominent physicians, chemists [i.e., pharmacists], dentists, and scientific gentlemen of all sections of the country."

Only a year after the discovery of X-rays in 1895, Sozodont used the scientific breakthrough to bolster its sales, noting in an advertisement, “Dr. Van Buskirk applies the Röntgen rays [X-rays] in his dental practice and find that those habitually using Sozodont have perfect teeth, hard gums, and sweet breath."

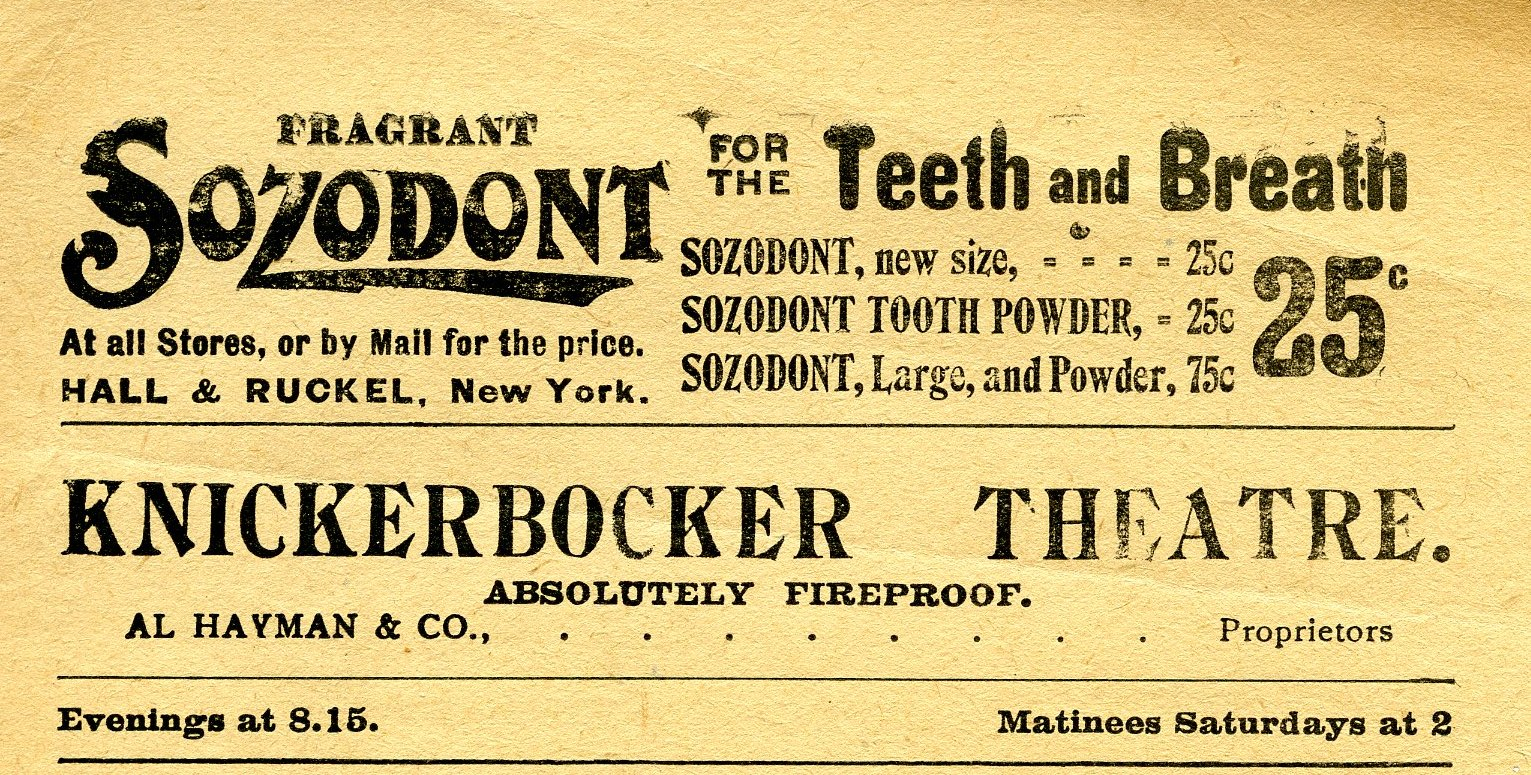
Advertisement showing price of product

== Decline in popularity ==
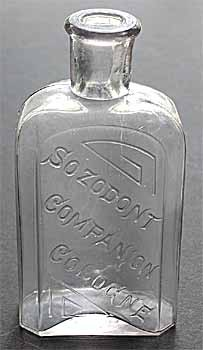
A Sozodont cologne bottle, introduced as a companion article to the Sozodont oral hygiene product.

Sozodont fell out of favor with consumers in the early twentieth century amid concerns about side effects of its usage. As early as 1880, however, one dentist complained, "I will testify to what is so well known to most dentists, viz., that it [Sozodont] destroys the color of the teeth, turning them to a decidedly dark-yellow." At the turn of the 20th century, another dentist echoed this complaint, stating that "The liquid of Sozodont . . . is far too alkaline for general use, and would in time destroy the enamel of the teeth and make them yellow."
