= Stanley D. Tylman =

Stanley Daniel Tylman (1893–1982) was an American dentist who taught more than 1,000 students at the University of Illinois at Chicago College of Dentistry in his career as a professor of dentistry (1920–1962) and head of the Department of Fixed Partial Prosthodontics, and also influenced dentists internationally.

== Biography ==
Tylman was particularly effective as a global educational force because he spoke four languages. His international lecture schedule took him to Asia, Europe, the Caribbean and South America—including Argentina, where he performed dental work for President Juan Peron and First Lady Evita Peron. Dentists worldwide traveled to Chicago for personal consultations with Dr. Tylman.

His breakthrough textbook, Theory and Practice of Crown and Bridge Prosthesis, nicknamed "Tylman's Bible", was published in several languages. He frequently was one of the editors of the annual Year Book of Dentistry.

Tylman was one of three dentists who founded the American Academy of Fixed Prosthodontics in 1951, and he served as President of the organization in 1960. The academy supports postdoctoral student research in fixed prosthodontics through its Stanley D. Tylman Research Program. Tylman Awards are given for outstanding research supported by a Tylman Grant.

== Awards and honors ==
The American College of Dentists honored Tylman with its William John Geis Award in 1973.
