= SOHP =

Oral health program in Kuwait

SOHP (School Oral Health Program) is a health program of Kuwait run by The Forsyth Institute, Boston, USA. and The Ministry of Health of Kuwait.

== Goal and methods of the program ==
The goal of the program is to improve the oral health of Kuwaiti school children. The plan is to provide preventive services, and oral health education to reduce the incidence of disease and curative services for the reduction of accumulated dental needs. The preventive services include the use of fluorides, the application of sealants. The education program emphasizes good oral hygiene, proper nutrition, and the need for periodic visits to the dentist. The curative services include the removal of infected or excessively damaged teeth, the repair of decayed and fractured teeth and deteriorated restorations, as well as the provision of space maintenance when indicated.

== Collaboration between Forsyth Institute and the Kuwait MoH ==
In 1982, the Kuwait Ministry of Health approached Forsyth Dental Infermary of Boston to conduct a public oral health research and to undertake public health activities. This was the beginning of a highly successful partnership. At the outset, Forsyth researchers carried out a large-scale dental health survey of children and produced the first report to characterize the dental condition of Kuwaiti children. This was followed by a corresponding survey for adults.

== School Oral Health Program History ==
In 1992 Kuwait asked Forsyth to implement the program in the governorate (province) of Al Jahra. In 1998 the program expanded into all four of the governorates viz. Hawally, Al Farwaniya, Al Ahmadi and Al Jahra. In 2004 another province called Mubarak Al Kabeer is al

The program is based in the schools themselves, beginning at the elementary level and now expanded into the middle schools. The clinics are staffed by dentists, dental assistants, and other dental professionals. Elementary schools are the early focus of the program, based on the premise that establishing good oral health knowledge and behavior patterns early in life will carry through to later life. In the classrooms the children receive education concerning oral health. In the school dental clinics the children are screened for dental problems and are provided preventive and restorative care as needed. Dental hygiene information is given to the families as well. The program also carries out training for its professional staff.

Children can receive emergency care even if they have not been identified through the school screening program. The program has been expanded to run through the summer to provide both regular and emergency care for children.

Today there are approximately 300,000 school children covered under the program in the four governorates. It is estimated that 60-70% of these children receive either preventive or therapeutic treatments. There are over 400 staff involved in the program, from chairside caregivers to assistants, administrators, educators, and coordinators.

Funding is provided entirely by the Kuwait government. This program is efficient, works well within Kuwait, and serves the needs of the school children. Because the program eventually will be run entirely by the Kuwaitis, they are being trained in all aspects, from the direct professional chairside care delivery through all of the administrative channels - which are significantly different in Kuwait than they would be in the United States.

In a sense, then, Forsyth's original mission of providing oral health care to school children has come full-circle through Kuwait, bringing the professional skills of this venerable institution to children who are in need.

== Educational, Preventive, and Curative Oral Health Protocols ==
The sole purpose of the educational, prevention and curative oral health activities under the School Oral Health Program is to nullify the incidence of hard and soft tissue diseases and bring out a new caries free generation. The protocols set by The Forth for the School Oral Health Program are:

=== The Educational side of Oral Health include ===
- Lectures to children, parents and teachers
- Counseling to expectant mothers
- Participate in health fairs etc.

=== The Preventive side of Oral Health include ===
- Application of topical fluoride
- Application of sealants to the sound occlusal surfaces
- Space maintainers

=== The Curative side of Oral Health include ===
- The curative oral health services focuses on the following:
- Charting and Oral Examination
- Oral Prophylaxis
- Fluoride Application
- Scaling
- OHI and Tooth brushing
- Fissure Sealant
- P.R.R.
- Liner
- Composite Filling
- Amalgam
- Pulpotomy / Pulpectomy / Permanent
- Pulpotomy / Pulpectomy / Primary
- Direct and Indirect Pulp Capping
- Stainless Steel Crown
- Temporary Filling
- Extraction
- Emergency Treatment
- Abscess
- Reseal
- Refill
- Recall Exam
- Referral
- X-Ray etc.
