= Central ossifying fibroma =

Benign neoplasm that may arise from the fibroblasts of the periodontal ligaments

Central ossifying fibroma (COF) is a benign fibro-osseous tumor that originates from the periodontal ligament. It is marked by the replacement of normal jawbone structure with a combination of fibrous connective tissue and mineralized material, such as bone or cementum-like deposits. The lesion demonstrates various patterns of bone formation within a fibroblastic stroma and is primarily found in the tooth-bearing regions of the jaw.

COF is most frequently observed in the mandible, typically affecting individuals in their third or fourth decade of life. According to the World Health Organization, ossifying fibroma falls under the category of fibro-osseous lesions and behaves clinically as a benign bone tumor. While it is a slow-growing and well-defined lesion, in some cases, it may expand significantly, leading to notable functional and aesthetic concerns.

In its early stages, COF is often asymptomatic and may be incidentally detected on routine radiographic examinations. However, as it enlarges, it can cause swelling, facial asymmetry, pain, and sensory disturbances due to bone destruction. Radiographic findings vary based on the stage of the lesion, ranging from radiolucent to mixed or radiopaque appearances.

Surgical intervention is the primary treatment, with smaller lesions managed through curettage or enucleation, while larger ones may require resection. These lesions generally do not recur, and histopathological analysis is essential for confirming the diagnosis.

== Epidemiology and demographic prevalence ==
Central ossifying fibroma (COF) is a rare benign lesion that typically affects young adults, with the highest incidence occurring between the ages of 20 and 40. It shows a distinct predilection for females, with a reported female-to-male ratio of 2:1. This fibro-osseous tumor is most commonly found in the mandible, particularly in the posterior regions, such as the molar or premolar areas, although it can also affect the maxilla. The condition has no strong racial or ethnic predisposition, though studies suggest higher prevalence in certain populations, such as those in South Asia.

== Etiology and pathogenesis ==
=== Etiology ===
The exact etiology of COF is not fully understood, but it is believed to arise from the mesenchymal tissues of the periodontal ligament or adjacent bone. Developmental anomalies, such as metaplastic changes in these tissues, contribute to the formation of the lesion. Additionally, genetic factors may play a role, with some studies suggesting that mutations or familial predisposition may predispose individuals to fibro-osseous lesions, including COF . Chronic trauma or irritation to the jaw could also lead to the formation of fibrous tissue, which eventually undergoes ossification. Hormonal influences may further contribute, as evidenced by the higher prevalence of COF in young women, although additional research is needed to establish a definitive link.

=== Pathogenesis ===
The pathogenesis of COF begins with the proliferation of mesenchymal cells in the periodontal ligament or adjacent bone, leading to fibrous tissue formation that undergoes metaplastic transformation into bone or cementum-like material . Initially composed of cellular fibrous tissue, the lesion gradually ossifies, resulting in varying amounts of bone and cementum-like deposits . It grows slowly, often causing cortical plate expansion and clinical signs such as facial asymmetry or swelling . Histologically, COF shows a well-defined fibrous stroma with calcified areas ranging from spongy to compact bone . Radiographically, it appears as a well-circumscribed radiolucent area with mixed radiopaque features, characteristic of fibro-osseous lesions.

== Classification and clinical presentation ==
There are four distinct clinicopathologic entities for ossifying fibroma of the craniofacial skeleton: cemento-ossifying fibroma [COF], which is an odontogenic ossifying fibroma; trabecular juvenile ossifying fibroma [TrJOF]; psammomatoid juvenile ossifying fibroma [PsJOF]; and extragnathic adult ossifying fibroma.

=== Cemento-Ossifying Fibroma ===
Cemento-ossifying fibroma (COF) typically presents as a painless jaw swelling, often detected incidentally on radiographs. It predominantly affects the mandible more than the maxilla, with the highest incidence in the third and fourth decades of life and a marked female predilection (female-to-male ratio up to 5:1).

Radiographically, COF appears as a well-defined unilocular lesion. In large mandibular cases, it may cause downward bowing of the inferior border. Tooth displacement is common, while root resorption is less frequently observed. If untreated, the lesion can grow substantially. Surgically, COF is usually well-demarcated from the surrounding bone and often easily enucleated. Some lesions may also exhibit a distinct capsule.

=== Juvenile Ossifying Fibroma (JOF) ===
Juvenile Ossifying Fibroma (JOF) refers to two distinct clinicopathologic subtypes: Trabecular Juvenile Ossifying Fibroma (TrJOF) and Psammomatoid Juvenile Ossifying Fibroma (PsJOF). The lesion is also known as juvenile aggressive or juvenile active ossifying fibroma.

=== Trabecular Juvenile Ossifying Fibroma (TrJOF) ===
TrJOF is histologically characterized by immature trabeculae of woven bone lacking osteoblastic rimming, set within a highly cellular fibrous stroma with strands of immature osteoid.

The lesion primarily affects children and adolescents, with fewer than 20% of cases occurring after age 15 . The average age range reported in case series is 8.5 to 12 years. It affects both sexes equally, with a slightly higher frequency in the maxilla compared to the mandible. Rare extragnathic cases involve the frontal or ethmoid bones.

Clinically, TrJOF presents as a painless but progressively enlarging mass. In maxillary cases, symptoms like epistaxis and nasal obstruction may occur. Radiographically, the lesion appears large and may cause cortical thinning or perforation. It may show varying radiolucent to radiopaque patterns depending on the degree of calcification, including a ground-glass or multilocular honeycomb appearance.

=== Psammomatoid Juvenile Ossifying Fibroma (PsJOF) ===
PsJOF typically affects a slightly older age group than TrJOF, with average ages ranging from 16 to 33 years, though cases have been reported from 3 months to 72 years.

Most cases originate in the paranasal sinuses, particularly the ethmoid and frontal sinuses [7,13]. Around 10% arise in the calvarium. Mandibular involvement is rare—Makek reported 7% of cases, while a later study found one in three cases involved the mandibular ramus.

Clinically, PsJOF manifests as bone expansion affecting the sinuses, orbit, or nasal bones. Orbital involvement may result in proptosis, visual disturbances (including blindness), nasal obstruction, ptosis, papilledema, and restricted ocular movement.

=== Extragnathic Adult Ossifying Fibroma of the Skull ===
Rarely, ossifying fibromas distinct from the common subtypes may arise in the cranial bones. These lesions lack psammomatoid or cementoid features and are composed of immature and mature bone trabeculae within a fibrous stroma. Reported locations include the frontal, parietal, temporal, sphenoid, and occipital bones. There is no gender predilection, and most cases occur in the second or third decades of life. Some tumours have exhibited intracerebral extension.

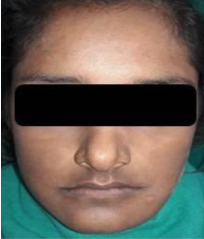
Frontal view shows mild asymmetry on the left side of the lower third of the face

Clinically, patients may present with localized swelling, pain, headaches, motor disturbances, exophthalmus, diplopia, and mild spastic hemiparesis . The median duration of symptoms is 3.2 years (range: 1–10 years) . Radiographically, these lesions appear as well-defined osteolytic areas with variable degrees of radiopacity.

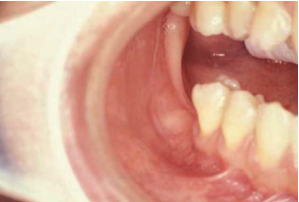
Intraoral image shows buccal cortical plate swelling over the edentulous ridge in the region of teeth #46 and #47, suggestive of central ossifying fibroma.

== Radiographic features ==
The radiographic features of central ossifying fibroma can be categorised according to the stages.

In its early stages, central ossifying fibroma (COF) appears as a small, well-defined radiolucent lesion due to its fibrous tissue content. Differential diagnoses at this stage include periapical pathology, central giant cell granuloma, and ameloblastoma. As the lesion matures, it exhibits a mixed radiolucent-radiopaque appearance due to progressive calcification. At this stage, it should be differentiated from other mixed jaw lesions such as fibrous dysplasia, calcifying epithelial odontogenic tumour, adenomatoid odontogenic tumour, and condensing osteitis. In its mature form, COF may appear predominantly radiopaque, resembling lesions like odontomas, osteoblastomas, or osteosarcomas radiographically.

COF typically presents with well-defined, smooth, and often corticated borders. As a central lesion, it originates within the medullary bone and expands concentrically in all directions. With growth, it may cause tooth displacement, root resorption, inferior displacement of the mandibular canal, and loss or alteration of the lamina dura of adjacent teeth.

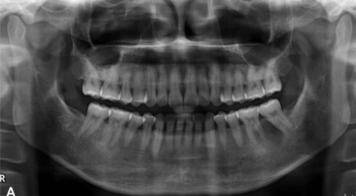
Panoramic radiograph showing a radiolucency around the distal root of the first mandibular molar

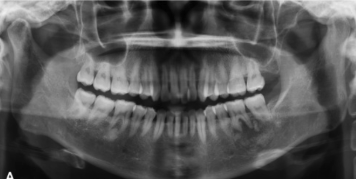
Panoramic radiograph showing a mixed radiopaque-radiolucent lesion around the root of the left first mandibular molar

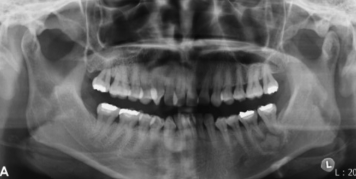
Panoramic radiograph showing a radiopaque lesion surrounded by a radiolucent rim around the root of left first and second mandibular molar

In conclusion, COF most commonly occurs in the mandible and expands from a central epicenter. Radiographically, it presents as a well-defined mixed-density lesion, and Cone Beam CT (CBCT) plays a crucial role in its accurate diagnosis and assessment.

== Histopathology ==
Cemento-ossifying fibroma is a well-demarcated lesion, often encapsulated by a thin fibrous capsule and sharply separated from adjacent normal bone. It shows significant internal variation, with differing amounts of fibrous and mineralized tissue—even within the same lesion. Mineralization is often more prominent centrally and typically includes osteoid, woven to lamellar bone, and dense basophilic cementum-like calcifications. Bony trabeculae may fuse into broad sheets or form thick, anastomosing strands. Osteoblastic rimming is commonly seen around bone trabeculae.

The stroma is fibroblastic and may exhibit areas of hypercellularity and nuclear hyperchromasia; however, mitotic activity is rare and cellular atypia is minimal . The mineralized component may include acellular or paucicellular cementum-like spheres along with bone structures .

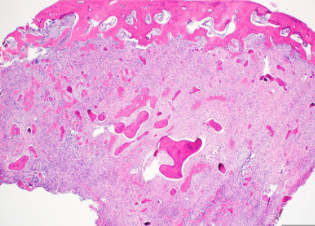
Well-defined fibrous connective tissue with calcified droplets and woven bone trabeculae, bordered by native lamellar bone.

Though rare, hemorrhagic cystic degeneration—resembling aneurysmal bone cyst formation—can occur, more commonly in juvenile variants. Histological overlap can exist among subtypes: psammomatoid and trabecular JOF may exhibit features resembling COF, and vice versa. In syndromic cases, such as gnathodiaphyseal dysplasia, COF lesions appear more fibrous with basophilic, acellular bone droplets and spherical ossicles, but histologically resemble nonsyndromic counterparts .

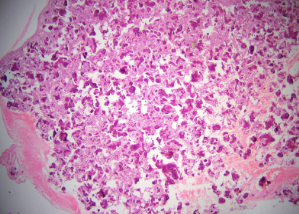
Ossifying Fibroma: Low-power photomicrograph shows a well-defined solid tumour mass composed of cellular fibrous connective tissue interspersed with cementum-like calcified droplets and trabeculae of bone.

== Diagnosis, management and treatment ==
Central Ossifying Fibroma (COF) typically presents as a painless swelling in the posterior mandible, though maxillary involvement can also occur. Larger lesions may lead to facial asymmetry and displacement of adjacent teeth. Radiographically, COF appears as a well-circumscribed, mixed radiolucent–radiopaque lesion with a characteristic sclerotic border, and the degree of radiopacity reflects the stage of mineralization. Cone-beam computed tomography (CBCT) offers detailed evaluation of cortical expansion, root displacement, and internal architecture.

Histologically, COF comprises a fibrocellular stroma with varying degrees of ossification, including trabecular or lamellar bone and cementum-like material. Differentiation from other fibro-osseous lesions—such as fibrous dysplasia and cemento-ossifying fibroma—requires histopathological assessment.

Treatment depends on lesion size, location, and symptoms. Small to moderate lesions are typically managed with enucleation and curettage, whereas large lesions with significant bone expansion may require segmental resection and reconstruction to restore function and aesthetics.

Postoperative follow-up is critical, as incomplete removal may lead to recurrence, although COF generally has a low recurrence rate. Regular clinical and radiographic monitoring for at least five years is recommended. With complete excision, the prognosis is typically favorable.

== Prognosis, research and future directions ==
Central ossifying fibroma (COF) is a benign fibro-osseous lesion of the jawbone, typically managed by surgical excision, including enucleation or resection. Conservative surgery often results in cure with low recurrence, though rates range from 0% to 28% overall, and up to 28.6% in pediatric cases. In children, poorly defined radiographic margins and curettage are linked to higher recurrence, while radical resection has the lowest recurrence rate. Long-term follow-up is essential.

COFs may reach considerable sizes, causing bone expansion and tooth displacement. Though rare, malignant transformation has been reported. In select cases, especially where tooth preservation is desired, conservative management with prolonged monitoring can be effective.

Research on COF spans multiple domains. Clinicopathologic studies examine presentation and histology across age groups. COF commonly affects females in the second to fourth decades, with mandibular predilection, particularly in premolar–molar regions, although a pediatric study noted male predominance. Its etiology remains unclear, but possible origins include multipotential mesenchymal cells of the periodontal ligament, with trauma and HRPT2 gene mutations also implicated.

Radiographically, COF may appear radiolucent, mixed, or radiopaque,, and histologically, it features bone or cementum-like material in a fibrocellular stroma. Surgical approaches range from curettage to radical resection, with reconstruction using free tissue grafts and platelet-rich gel (PRG) to enhance bone healing.

Future research should focus on genetic mechanisms and risk factors. long-term outcomes of conservative treatment, and refinement of surgical techniques, including 3D printing for planning and PRG for regeneration. Advances in imaging and AI may improve early diagnosis and differentiation from similar lesions. Understanding recurrence mechanisms is vital for optimizing treatment and follow-up, and studies on quality of life and prosthetic rehabilitation, including dental implants, will support better clinical decision-making.
