= Osteoporotic bone marrow defect =

Bone marrow defect in Mandible

Osteoporotic bone marrow defect is a condition which may be found in the body of the mandible. It is usually painless and found during routine radiographs. It appears as a poorly defined radiolucency (dark area) where there was a previous history of an extraction of a tooth. It may resemble a metastatic disease.

It is a localized increase of hematopoietic bone marrow that creates a radiolucent radiographic defect. They occur more commonly in women in the midyears and show a predilection for the molar region of the mandible. They are especially common in extraction sites. Scattered trabeculae may extend short distances into the defect or, in some instances, through it, giving the defect a fairly characteristic appearance. Naturally there are no clinical symptoms.

== Cause ==
The cause remains unknown.

== Diagnosis ==
=== Differential diagnosis ===
This defect may easily be mistaken for a cyst or tumor. Biopsy may be required to rule these out.

== Treatment ==
No treatment is required.
