= Charles G. Maurice =

American dentist

Dr. Charles G. Maurice (1911–1997) was an American dentist and academic. In a teaching career that spanned 37 years at the University of Illinois at Chicago College of Dentistry, he began in the old Department of Applied Materia Medica and Therapeutics and ended up establishing the Department of Endodontics, becoming its first head in 1967. This was not his first pioneering effort in endodontics as he was one of the founders of the American Association of Endodontists in 1943. He also was a diplomate of the American Board of Endodontics, and was a contributor to the textbook Endodontology. The Charles G. Maurice Endodontic Resource Facility at the UIC College of Dentistry was dedicated in 1990, and the college's Charles G. Maurice Fund supports postgraduate education, clinical care, and research in endodontics; general Department of Endodontics needs; and the Maurice Lecture.

Certified as a periodontist in 1954, Maurice developed, organized and conducted postgraduate courses in both periodontics and endodontics. His laboratory manual for preclinical endodontics, updated, is still in use. He authored many publications and was an important contributor to the textbook Endodontology.

Maurice served as a major in the U.S. Army during World War II.
