= Open Dental =

Dental practice management software

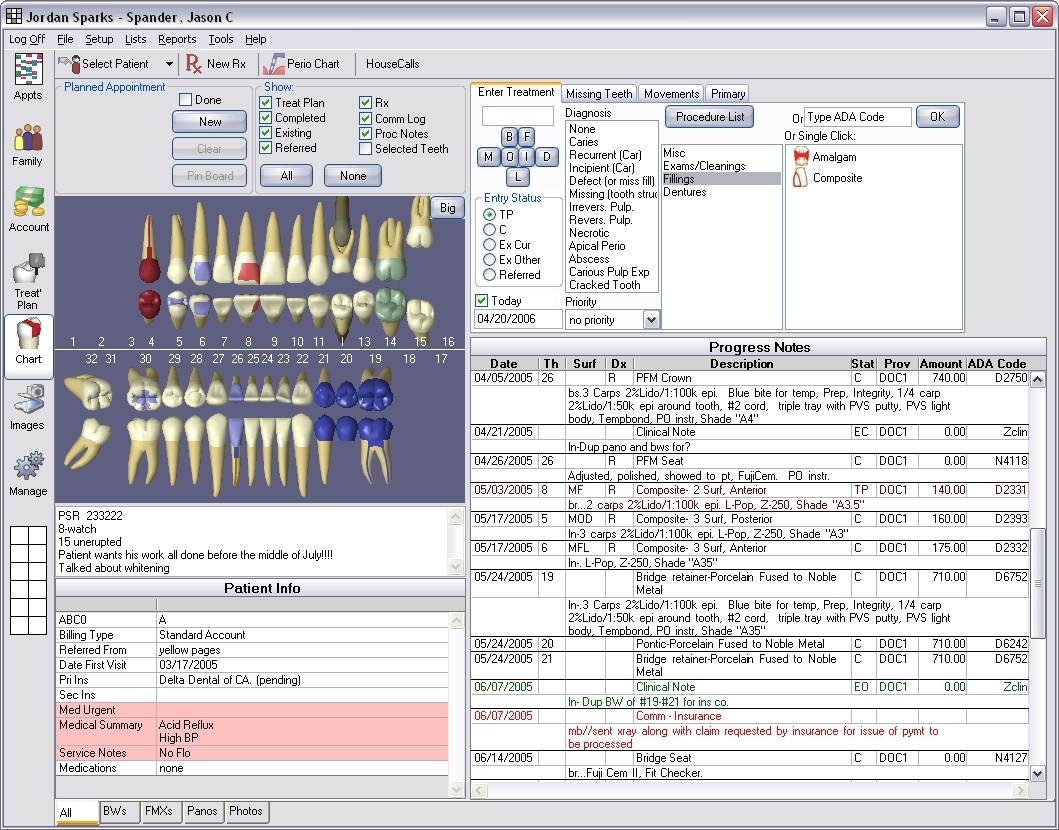
- Practice Management Software
- Original author: Jordan Sparks
- Stable release: 23.1 / July 31, 2023; 2 years ago
- Preview release: 23.2 (Beta) / July 31, 2023; 2 years ago
- Written in: C#
- Operating system: Microsoft Windows
- Available in: Multiple Language Packs
- Type: Dental practice management software
- License: Proprietary (before version 24.4: GNU GPL)
- Website: www.opendental.com
- Repository: github.com/OpenDental

Open Dental, previously Free Dental, is a proprietary software tool for dental practice management. It is written in the C# programming language compatible with Microsoft .NET Framework and was first released in 2003. Current versions of the software require Microsoft Windows, but earlier versions supported other operating systems, including Linux.

Open Dental is owned and sponsored by Open Dental Software, Inc., an Oregon corporation. The first Open Dental customer bought technical support services on July 22, 2003.

== Awards ==
Best Dental Practice Management Software Provider 2018, Global Health & Pharma (GHP)

DrBicuspid.com 2017 Dental excellence Awards: Best New/Updated Software/Service

== See also ==
- List of FLOSS healthcare programs
