= Norman Simmons (biochemist) =

American biochemist

Norman S. Simmons
- Born: 28 May 1915; New York City
- Died: 7 January 2004 (aged 88); Los Angeles
- Education: City College of New York, Harvard University; University of Rochester (Ph.D. 1950)
- Known for: Isolating structurally pure DNA
- Scientific career
- Fields: Dentistry, molecular biology
- Institutions: UCLA Medical School, UCLA Dental School
- Thesis: Investigation of Submaxillary Mucoid and the Defense Mechanisms of the Mouth

Norman Simmons (May 28, 1915 – January 27, 2004) was a DNA research pioneer.

== Life ==
Norman Simmons was born in New York City in 1915. He obtained a B.S. at the City College of New York, a D.M.D.at Harvard University, and a Ph.D. in 1950 at University of Rochester, with a dissertation titled “Investigation of Submaxillary Mucoid and the Defense Mechanisms of the Mouth:" this was regarded as truly innovative.

He was also a sculptor, painter, actor and musician, throughout his life. He died in Los Angeles in 2004, survived by his wife and two sons.

== Career ==
He was appointed as a professor of biophysics and nuclear medicine in the UCLA Medical School, and of oral medicine in the UCLA Dental School, and he participated in the development of the latter. He remained at UCLA for the whole of his career.

== Research ==
Simmons worked with Elkan Blout on proteins and polypeptides and was also recognized for isolating a structurally pure form of DNA. This was the DNA which Rosalind Franklin used in her X-ray diffraction studies that rewarded Maurice Wilkins, James Watson and Francis Crick with the Nobel Prize for the double helix model of DNA. In his Nobel Prize lecture of 1962, Wilkins thanked Simmons "for having refined techniques of isolating DNA, and thereby helping a great many workers including ourselves."
