= Squamous odontogenic tumor =

Squamous odontogenic tumors (SOTs) are very rare benign locally infiltrative odontogenic neoplasms of epithelial origin. Only some 50 cases have been documented. They occur mostly from 20-40 and are more common in males. Treatment is by simple enucleation and local curettage, and recurrence is rare.

== Clinical appearance ==
Clinically, they are initially slow growing and asymptomatic but may cause mobility or displacement of teeth. They may occur anywhere in the jaws but are more common in the posterior mandible and anterior maxilla. They are usually intrabony, but some peripheral cases have been observed. Radiographically, they are small unilocular or larger multilocular well defined non-corticated radiolucencies, triangular or crescent in shape, with the base apically between adjacent roots of vital teeth. They are often misdiagnosed as periodontitis. SOT should be suspected where isolated periodontal defects occur without obvious risk factors.

== Histology ==
Lesions are non-encapsulated with islands of well differentiated squamous epithelium that commonly contain microcysts and calcifications in a dense fibrous connective tissue stroma. The pathogenesis is unclear but they appear to arise from the gingival epithelium or cell rests of Malassez or Serres. This presentation is similar to that of squamous cell carcinomas; however, the epithelium of SOT is highly differentiated.
