= SoftDent =

- Developer: Carestream Dental
- Stable release: 19.0
- Operating system: Microsoft Windows
- Type: Practice Management Software
- License: Proprietary
- Website: www.SoftDent.com

SoftDent is a practice management software for dental offices. Originally developed by InfoSoft, based in White Marsh, MD. SoftDent was purchased by PracticeWorks which was then bought by Kodak. In May 2007, Kodak sold the dental PMS software business to Canadian company Onex, renamed Carestream, which currently markets and supports the SoftDent application. Carestream Dental split from Carestream Health in 2017 to be a stand-alone company. The application is not suited for very large offices or multi-location offices. The most recent version as of 2024 is v19.0. Earlier versions of SoftDent used Faircom C-Tree exclusively. Later versions of SoftDent introduced additional modules integrated with the core application and relied on Microsoft SQL. This made SoftDent a unique application suite in that data could flow back and forth between different add-on modules for scheduling, electronic forms delivery, and mobile accessibility.
