= Guantanamo detainees' medical care =

Healthcare for inmates at Guantanamo Bay detention camp

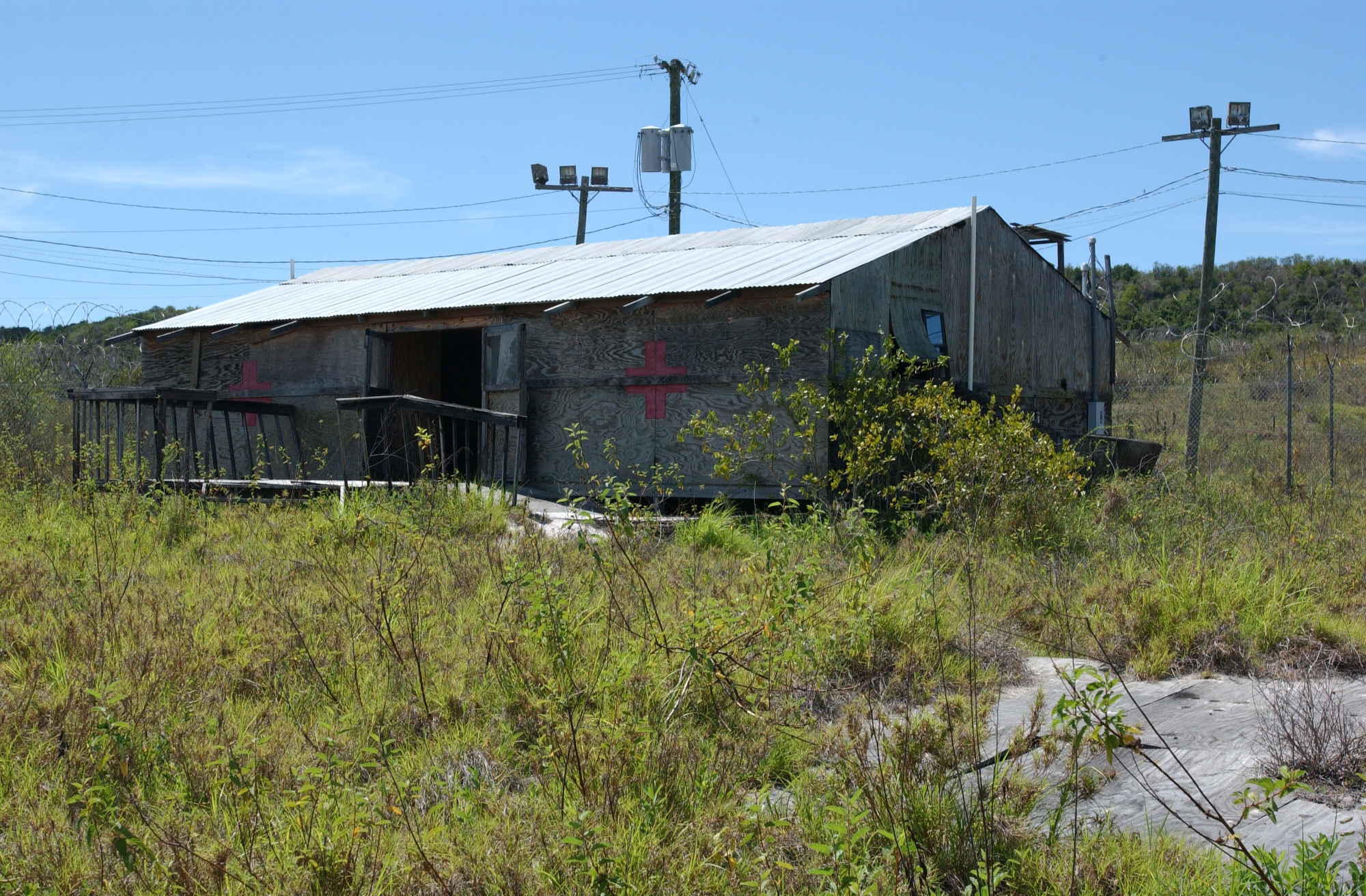
Abandoned hospital used in Camp X-Ray in early 2002.

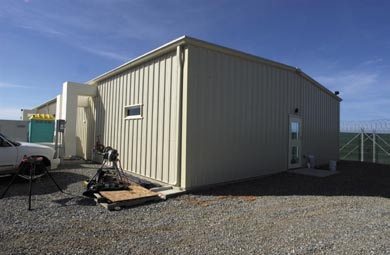
$2.9 million, 12 bed, psychiatric facility for Guantanamo captives.

Separate facilities exist to provide for Guantanamo detainees' medical care.

A 2013 Institute on Medicine as a Profession report concluded that health professionals working with the military and intelligence services "designed and participated in cruel, inhumane and degrading treatment and torture of detainees". Medical professionals were ordered to ignore ethical standards during involvement in abusive interrogation, including monitoring of vital signs under stress-inducing procedures. They used medical information for interrogation purposes and participated in force-feeding of hunger strikers, in violation of World Medical Association and American Medical Association prohibitions.

A series of hospitals, dental clinics and psychiatric facilities have been prepared for Guantanamo detainees.

== Cost ==
On June 7, 2010, the Washington Post reported, after obtaining the first official figures for capital costs of the Guantanamo camps to be made public, that the current hospital building cost US$18.2 million, and a companion psychiatric facility cost US$2.9 million.

== Quality ==
Military spokesmen have routinely asserted that the detainees receive excellent medical care. Documentary film director Michael Moore used these claims as a central meme in his film Sicko to argue that American citizens should receive better medical care. Former detainees on the other hand have described medical care being withheld at the command of interrogators, in order to coerce detainees to confess. Civilian medical professionals who have evaluated detainees and interfaced with Guantanamo's medical care system have criticized the system for lacking the capabilities necessary to diagnose and treat detainees in a manner that meets professional standards of care, especially as detainees age and develop increasingly complex medical conditions. Critics have described the use of the detainees' medical files by interrogators as a violation of medical ethics. Critics have expressed concern that medical personnel violated their professional ethics by aiding in or failing to report the wounds inflicted during interrogations that used prohibited techniques.

Over eighty of the detainees' weights have fallen to life-threatening levels. Claims have come out about the medical staff at Guantanamo Bay are force-feeding the detainees under the instruction of the Base Commander— violating medical ethics proscribed by the World Medical Association and the American Medical Association. Hunger strikes had taken place at the detention camp as a way to protest their treatment and imprisonment. The Department of Defense defended the action, claiming it was done to promote and preserve life. Many other detainees became obese on the camp's food.

On August 8, 2017, a detainee who remains at Guantanamo filed a motion in federal court requesting a Mixed Medical Commission, which is provided for in Army regulations that implement the Geneva Conventions. The purpose of a Mixed Medical Commission is to independently assess whether a detainee is entitled to medical repatriation. In a sworn declaration provided to the court, a medical expert who has evaluated Mr. al Qahtani stated that he “requires urgent, immediate and potentially life-saving mental health treatment” which Guantanamo is unable to provide “given the constraints of providing care at Guantánamo.” The government opposed Mr. al-Qahtani’s motion. In March 2020, the court ordered the government to provide the Mixed Medical Commission. The government appealed the decision but the appeal was denied. The case is still pending.

On August 5, 2021, 75 Members of the House of Representatives wrote to President Joe Biden expressing concern that "the medical records of some detainees are not being made available to the detainees or their representatives in a timely fashion, purportedly based on the claim that the withheld records are classified in whole or in part." They emphasized the United States' "responsibility to treat detainees at the Guantanamo prison humanely and make appropriate accommodations to provide for their medical care," including providing complete medical information to detainees and their representatives in a timely fashion.

== Dental care ==
The existence and quality of the medical care and dental care, at Guantanamo, has been the subject of public disagreement. After viewing Andy Worthington's film, Witness to Guantanamo, which compiled interviews with former captives, law professor Peter Jan Honigsberg wrote that the captives said dental care was dispensed at the discretion of the captives' interrogators. He wrote "Some prisoners who expected to have cavities filled, had their teeth pulled instead." Jane Mayer, writing in The New Yorker quoted Rob Kirsch, who represented six Bosnians, who also said dental care was routinely withheld by their interrogators. After a visit to Guantanamo Congressional Representative William Lacy Clay asserted that many Guantanamo captives received dental care for the first time in Guantanamo. He asked "did Hitler and Pol Pot provide dental care to their prisoners before they killed them?" In her book, Kristine Huskey, one of the lawyers at the Center for Constitutional Rights, which was coordinating the captives' habeas corpus petitions, quoted a motion the Center filed, that described the captives' dental care as inadequate.

In a July 2009 interview Commander Kenneth Bell said that it took several times longer to treat captives as it did to treat guards, for similar dental procedures, because captives didn't understand why the dental procedures were in the interest of their health. He said dental procedures were never performed on the captives without their consent.

== See also ==
- Behavioral Science Consultation Team
