= Dappen glass =

A dappen glass (also called Dappen Dish) is a small, dense glass or ceramic vessel which has each end ground or hollowed out to provide a bowl for mixing substances. Generally these dishes have ten equal walls (decagon) with a large bowl on one side and a smaller bowl ground out on the other. Dappen glasses are most commonly used in dentistry, as vessels for mixing dental medicaments or fillings, though they have also come to be used by artists (for mixing inks or paints), the cosmetics/beauty industry for holding small quantities of nail product or dyes, and chemistry labs. The term "Dappen Glass" is sometimes mistakenly applied to any dish that has two or more concave surfaces that is used for storing or mixing substances.
