= Metastatic tumor of jaws =

Type of cancer involving bone

Metastatic tumor of jaws is the most common form of cancer involving bone. It affects the mandible in 61% of cases, the maxilla in 24% of cases, and soft tissue in 16% of cases. In the majority of cases, the tumor originated in the breast, lung, kidney, colon, or prostate. The original tumor usually spreads to the jaws through Batson's paravertebral plexus. Teeth can become mobile and paresthesia can occur. On radiographs, the periodontal ligaments appear widened, and the cancer has a moth-eaten appearance.
