= Median alveolar cyst =

Type of growth in the upper jaw

The median alveolar cyst is a rare cyst, occurring in the bony alveolus between the maxillary central incisors. It is distinguished from a periapical cyst by the fact that adjacent teeth are vital.

== Treatment ==
Treatment is by enucleation, or surgical removal.
