= Segmental odontomaxillary dysplasia =

Segmental odontomaxillary dysplasia is a painless, unilateral enlargement of the upper jaw. The cause is unknown, and the disease affects the jaws, teeth, and adjacent soft tissue. The premolars may be congenitally missing, and the primary teeth (baby teeth) may be smaller than usual. It is a relatively recent discovery.

== Description ==
It is a rare developmental disorder that affects maxilla, also known as the upper jaw in most vertebrates. The disorder is often diagnosed in early childhood. Since its original description as hemimaxillofacial dysplasia by doctors in 1987, less than 40 cases have been reported in the English literature.

== Epidiomology ==
All cases reported appear to represent sporadic occurrence. There is no specific inheritance pattern. The male-to-female ratio of affected is 1.8:1 and is often diagnosed before the age of 9. The disorder affects the right and left sides of the maxilla almost equally.
