= Mouth assessment =

Part of patient assessment performed on the mouth

Parts of the mouth

A mouth assessment is performed as part of a patient's health assessment. The mouth is the beginning of the digestive system and a substantial part of the respiratory tract. Before an assessment of the mouth, patient is sometimes advised to remove any dentures. The assessment begins with a dental-health questionnaire, including questions about toothache, hoarseness, dysphagia (difficulty swallowing), altered taste or a frequent sore throat, current and previous tobacco use and alcohol consumption and any sores, lesions or bleeding of the gums.

== Lips ==
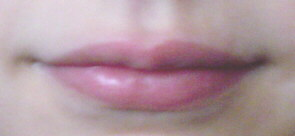
Normal lips

The lips are normally symmetrical, pink, smooth, and moist. There should be no growths, lumps, or discoloration of the tissue. Abnormal findings are asymmetricality, cyanosis, a cherry-red or pale color or dryness. Diseases include mucocele, aphthous ulcer, angular stomatitis, carcinoma, cleft lip, leukoplakia, herpes simplex and chelitis.

== Teeth ==
Tooth condition indicates a person's general health. Teeth should be clean with no decay, white with shiny enamel and smooth surfaces and edges. Adults should have a total of 32 teeth (16 teeth in each arch). By the age of 2 1/2, children have a total of 20 deciduous teeth (10 in each arch). Abnormal findings are missing, loose, broken and misaligned teeth. Diseases of the teeth include baby-bottle tooth decay, epulis, meth mouth and Hutchinson's teeth.

== Gums ==
To assess the gums, a tongue depressor gently retracts the cheek to allow inspection of the upper and lower gums. They should appear symmetrical, moist and pinkish, with well-defined margins. Dark-skinned people may have a melanotic line along the gum margin. Abnormal findings include swelling, cyanosis, paleness, dryness, sponginess, bleeding or discoloration. Diseases include leukoplakia, epulis, gingival hyperplasia, gingivitis, periodontitis and aphthous ulcer (canker sore).

== Oral mucosa ==
To check the oral mucosa, the patient's cheek is exposed with a tongue depressor and the tissues inspected with a penlight. Healthy tissue appears moist, smooth, shiny and pink. Stensen's duct is opposite the second molar. Abnormal findings include dryness, cyanosis, paleness and Fordyce spots, and signs of disease include canker sores, Koplik's spots (an early indication of measles), candidiasis and leukoplakia.

== Hard palate ==
The patient tilts their head back and opens their mouth for the hard-palate assessment. Visual inspection with a penlight shows a healthy palate as whitish in color, with a firm texture and irregular transverse rugae. Abnormal findings include yellowness or extreme pallor, and diseases include torus palatinus, cleft palate, submucous cleft palate, High-arched palate, Kaposi's sarcoma and leukoplakia.

== Soft palate and uvula ==
The soft palate is checked with a penlight. It should be light pink, smooth and upwardly movable. To check the uvula, a tongue blade is pressed down on the patient's tongue and the patient is asked to say "ah"; the uvula should look like a pendant in the midline and rise along the soft palate. Abnormal findings include deviation of the uvula from the midline, an asymmetrical rise of the soft palate or uvula and redness of either. Diseases include bifid uvula, cleft palate and carcinoma. If cranial nerve 10 is injured, the soft palate does not rise when the mouth is opened.

== Tongue ==
All sides of the tongue are assessed. To inspect the dorsal side (top) of the tongue, a patient sticks out their tongue. A healthy dorsal tongue is symmetrical, pink, moist, slightly rough from the papillae, possibly with a thin, whitish coating. The sides of the tongue are inspected with a gloved hand holding a piece of gauze. The tongue is moved side to side and inspected; it should be pink, moist, smooth and glistening. Assessment of the ventral (bottom) surface of the tongue is done by having the patient touch the tip of their tongue against the roof of their mouth. If healthy, it should have prominent veins and be pink, smooth, moist, glistening and free of lesions. The frenulum should be centered under the tongue. Abnormal findings includes marked redness, cyanosis or extreme pallor. Diseases include scrotal or fissured tongue, migratory glossitis (geographic tongue), atrophic glossitis, black hairy tongue, caviar lesions, carcinoma, macroglossia, candidiasis, aphthous ulcer and leukoplakia.

== Tonsils (if present) ==
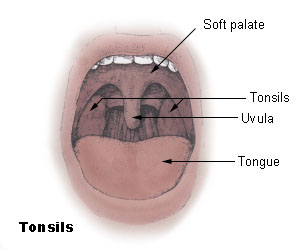

To assess the tonsils, a patient opens their mouth and a tongue blade is used to depress the tongue. A penlight is used to inspect the back of the patient's throat, looking for pink, symmetrical and normal-size tonsils. Tonsil size is graded as follows:

- 1+ Visible
- 2+ Halfway between the tonsillar pillars and the uvula
- 3+ Touching the uvula
- 4+ Touching each other

Abnormal findings include bright-red, enlarged tonsils or white or yellow tonsillar exudate. Tonsillitis is an inflammation of the tonsils.

== Special populations ==
Patients with Down syndrome and cretinism have delayed tooth eruption, and prolonged thumb-sucking may cause problems with mouth growth and tooth alignment. Gingivitis is one of the most prevalent oral problems associated with pregnancy, occurring in 60–75 percent of pregnant women.
