= Tooth development =

Tooth development may refer to:

- Animal tooth development
- Human tooth development
