= Donald Leake =

American oral surgeon, inventor, and musician (1931–1997)

Brussels Donald Lewis Leake (November 6, 1931 – December 31, 1997) was an oral surgeon, and inventor of the alloplastic tray, a method for reconstruction of jaws without the need for bone grafts. He gained his D.M.D. from Harvard University in 1962, and an M.D. from Stanford University in 1969. In 1970, Leake was employed at Harvard Medical School as an oral surgeon, and since 1971, Leake had been a Professor of Oral and Maxillofacial Surgery at UCLA.

Leake is also a noted oboist, having studied with Henri de Busscher, and in 1956 gained Premier Prix avec Distinction in Oboe, and Premier Prix avec la Plus Grande Distinction in Chamber Music from the Conservatoire Royal de Musique in Brussels. He received an M.A. in music history in 1957, and continued his musical career in parallel with his dental one.
