= Geriatric dentistry =

Delivery of dental care to older adults

Geriatric Dentistry
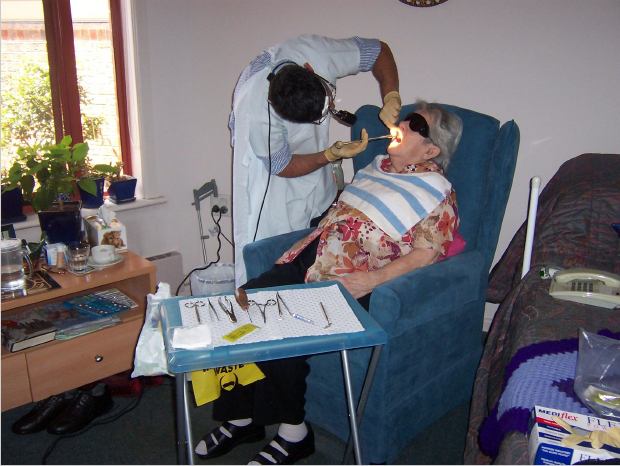
- An elderly woman in a residential care home receiving dental treatment
- Significant diseases: Dementia, arthritis, palliative care, osteoporosis, osteoarthritis, rheumatoid arthritis, Parkinson's disease, atherosclerosis, heart disease, high blood pressure, high cholesterol
- Specialist: Dentist

Geriatric dentistry is the delivery of dental care to older adults involving diagnosis, prevention, management and treatment of problems associated with age related diseases. The mouth is referred to as a mirror of overall health, reinforcing that oral health is an integral part of general health. In the elderly population poor oral health has been considered a risk factor for general health problems. Older adults are more susceptible to oral conditions or diseases due to an increase in chronic conditions and physical/mental disabilities. Thus, the elderly form a distinct group in terms of provision of care.

== Ageing Population ==
The world's population is currently ageing with the number and proportion of elderly people growing substantially. Between the years of 2000–2005 to 2010-2015 life expectancy at birth rose from 67.2 to 70.8 years. By 2045-2050 it is projected to continue increase to 77 years. This increasing longevity can be majorly attributed to advances in modern medicine and medical technology. As a result, the population of people aged 60 and over is growing faster than any other younger age group and it is expected to more than double by 2050 globally. This will have a profound effect on society's ability to support the needs of this growing crowd including their dental needs.

Older people have become a major focus for the oral health industry. Due to the increasing number and proportion of elderly people, age related dental problems have become more common. This is largely due to success in dental treatment and prevention of gum disease and caries at a young age, thereby leading to people retaining more of their own natural teeth. As they get older, the retained teeth are at risk of developing and accumulating oral diseases that are more extensive and severe.

== Geriatrics as a Dental Specialty ==
In Australia geriatric dentistry is falls under the 'Special needs dentistry' specialty which is recognised by the Dental Board of Australia. This is because often age related problems and medication can make oral health disease and conditions much more serious and complicated to treat. As a result, they require specialized and individualized treatment and considerations. It is however, important to recognize that, contrary to popular belief, ageing is not synonymous with disease and should not be considered pathologic, and rather a natural and inevitable physiological process.

In the United Kingdom the General Dental Council has as total of thirteen specialties, however, geriatrics is not one of them. Special care dentistry is however recognised as an area of specialty and focuses on the prevention and management of oral health conditions for people who have physical, sensory, intellectual, mental, emotional or social impairment or disability. Mostly for adults and adolescents and therefore older people.

In America, geriatrics is not currently formally recognised by the American Dental Association as an area of specialty. The Harvard Dental School of Medicine however, does offer a further two-year study for a certificate in geriatric dentistry. This program trains dentist in the specialised care for the population group of older people who often experience disparity.

The Royal College of Dentists of Canada does not recognise geriatrics as one of its nine specialties.

== The Geriatric Patient ==
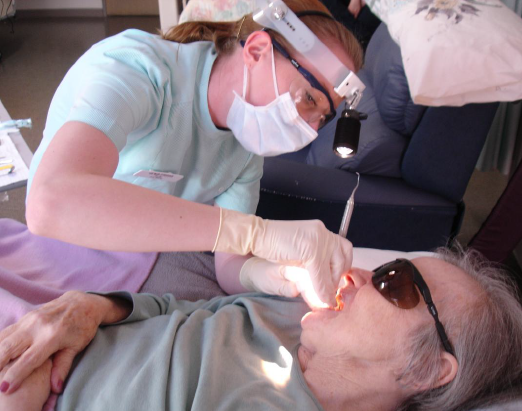
Frail elderly patient receiving dental care

The elderly can be classified into many criteria. Classifying them allows for a more detailed and accurate analysis of the diversity within this age group and makes diagnosis and treatment planning more personalised. The following is a common classification of the elderly according to age group.

- Young-old → 65-74
- Middle-old → 75-84
- Oldest-old → ≥ 85

The dental classification of ageing however is more useful if it is based on the patient's ability to seek dental care independently.

- Frail elderly have chronic, debilitating, physical, medical and emotional problems who are unable to maintain independence without continued assistance from others. As a result, the majority of the frail elderly live in the community with support services.
- Functionally dependent elderly have chronic, debilitating, physical and medical or emotional problems or any combination that compromises their capacity to the extent where they are unable to maintain independence and as a result are homebound or institutionalized

== Dental Health of Geriatric Population ==
Smooth Surface Caries Progression

The geriatric population are an ever growing section of the community with rapidly changing dental needs. In 2020 it is predicted that more than 25% of the population in developed countries will be over the age of 65. Due to improvements in oral health over the past 60 years, a decrease in the rate of edentulism is evident and therefore an increase in the number of natural teeth present is present

In 1979, 60% of Australians over the age of 65 had no natural teeth. In 1989, 44% had no teeth and it is expected by 2019, this figure will drop to 20%. This prediction was exceeded in 2013, with 19% of those over the age of 65 had no natural teeth.

Although there is a decrease in the rate of edentulism, geriatric patients typically have high levels of plaque, calculus and debris, as they are functionally dependent on others or have lost the capacity to complete tasks such as toothbrushing thoroughly. Consequently, this results in an increased caries prevalence. Dental caries is a process in which enamel is dissolved by acid producing bacteria. In 2004–2006, the average DMFT (decayed, missing and filled teeth) for adults in Australia over the age of 65 was found to be 23.7%. An individual's caries risk is influenced by their sugar intake, frequency of eating, oral hygiene levels, saliva flow and function and recession. Gingival recession is a significant finding in older adults because the exposed root surface is more susceptible to root caries and therefore increases the risk for the patient. In 2015, 95.2% of Australians over the age of 75 had at least one site with gingival recession. Additionally, periodontal disease prevalence was also great as 26.0% of the geriatric population was diagnosed with active periodontal disease.

== Medical Conditions affecting Oral Health ==
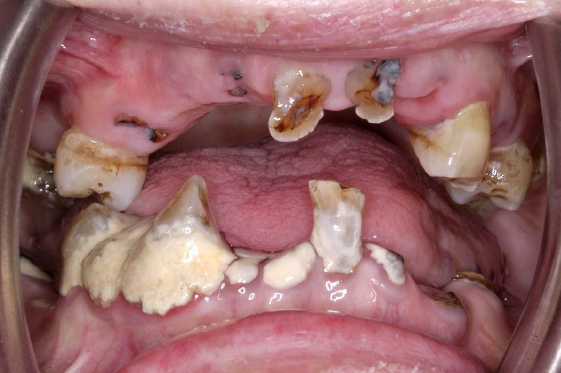
Intra-oral photograph showing gross carious lesions, severe periodontitis and heavy dental calculus deposits

A number of physiological changes happen to the geriatric population with age. The gastrointestinal, renal, cardiovascular, respiratory, and immune systems often decrease in efficiency, and this impacts upon the entire body, including oral health.

Along with physiological changes, physical ones involve reduced bone and muscle mass Mobility can be decreased due to osteoarthritis, and a variety of audio and visual changes such as cataracts, macular degeneration, and hearing loss can make communication, patient education and oral health care increasingly difficult to maintain.

The majority of elderly people have at least one chronic condition, with many having multiple. The most common of these include hypertension, arthritis, heart disease, cancers and diabetes. Other prevalent conditions include dementia, depression, hearing loss, cataracts, back and neck pain, and chronic obstructive pulmonary disease.

Geriatric patients may demonstrate a spectrum of cognitive acuity, and dementia is categorised by a progressive deterioration in cognition that eventually affects an individual's capability to function independently. More often than not, this is diagnosed in the elderly population. Unfortunately this disease impacts upon the ability to manage their medications, systemic conditions, and oral hygiene. As the severity of the impairment increases, the elderly become much more susceptible to develop dental caries, periodontal disease and oral infection, primarily because of the reduced capability to maintain good oral health at home.

The elderly usually develop a decrease in appetite, leading to a lower intake of vitamins and minerals. However, many nutrients are recommended at the same amounts as younger people. Another reason why inadequate nutrition levels are more prominent with elders is if their dental status is poor, with missing teeth or ill fitting dentures, it can negatively affect their taste and ability to chew on food. Even well-fitted dentures are less efficient than natural teeth in terms of chewing, so changes in diet to softer foods often happen. Such foods often contain more fermentable carbohydrates, which raise individuals' risk to developing dental caries.

== Oral changes ==
The most common oral conditions in geriatric patients are tooth loss, dental caries, periodontitis, dry mouth and oral cancer. Each can affect the quality of life.

=== Changes to Saliva ===
Polypharmacy is common in geriatric patients, which can cause a multitude of symptoms. Xerostomia is amongst the most common, commonly linked to antidepressants, psycholeptics, inhaled medications such as Salbutamol and the slight degeneration of salivary gland function with aging. Chronic dry mouth is prevalent in a high proportion of the elderly population, affecting roughly one fifth of the group. There has been a link between dry mouth and comorbid diseases including diabetes, Alzheimer's or Parkinson's disease Additionally, xerostomia can arise from general dehydration. A dry mouth can be associated with caries, cracked lips, fissured tongue and oral mucositis. It can impact heavily on the patient's quality of life, affecting taste, speaking, enjoyment and ingestion of food, and fitting dentures.

Human tongue infected with oral candidiasis - more commonly known as oral thrush

=== Changes to the Oral Mucosa ===
Changes to the oral mucous membrane including the epithelium and connective tissue, result in decreased immunity against pathogens. There is a loss of elasticity and stippling, with a general thinning over time. Diseases such as oral thrush can become more prevalent, and the healing rate lowers. Geriatric patients are more likely to develop oral cancers too, which often start on the side of the tongue, floor of mouth or lips.

=== Changes to the Teeth ===
With continued chewing, talking, and general use, the tooth eventually wears down with attrition and dental erosion most commonly seen. The outermost translucent layer, enamel, does not regenerate, so as it thins down the underlying yellowish layer, dentine, can show through or even become exposed. Aesthetically, teeth may look more yellow than white, and can become stained more easily. Dentine continues to be produced, resulting in the formation of secondary dentine. Gradually however, the tubules obturate and lead to dentinal sclerosis. The innermost layer containing the nerves, pulp, develops more fibres and less cells leading to shrinkage. A reduced blood supply means that an elderly patient's pulp does not have the same capacity to heal itself compared with younger patients. Calcification of the pulp with the root canals narrowing increases in frequency with the geriatric population too. This can often lead to decreased sensitivity to stimuli, e.g. cold or sweet foods. Cementum on the tooth roots is continually produced; however with age the rate this happens slows down, leaving the geriatric patient at a higher risk for developing root caries.

=== Ageing and Periodontal Disease ===
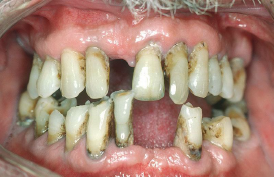
Periodontal Disease

The instance of periodontal disease increases with age, however it is not due to the nature of the condition, but rather indicates the patient's cumulative oral history. Due to the aging process and certain health conditions of the geriatric population; they can be more susceptible to pathogenic anaerobic bacteria infecting the periodontium and initiating inflammation. Age increases the risk of periodontal disease but does not cause it. Most of the geriatric community have moderate levels of attachment loss, with less having advanced stages of the disease. Active periodontitis is a risk factor for certain systemic diseases as well, including cardiovascular disease, stroke and aspiration pneumonia.

== Dental care in residential aged care facilitates ==
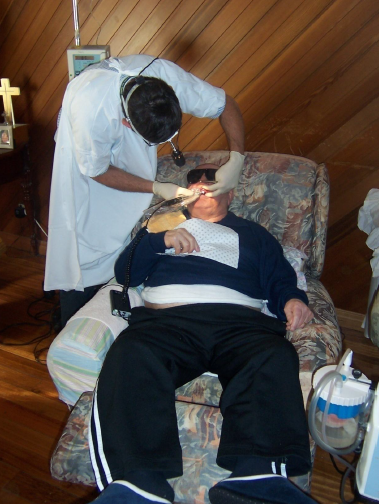
Paralysed and functionally dependent patient receiving dental care

Elderly people in residential care facilities are considered to have some of the poorest oral health in Australia, and are some of our most vulnerable and disadvantaged population groups.

Elderly people who are functionally dependant and residing in residential care facilities, are particularly vulnerable to oral health issues such as periodontal disease, dental caries, particularly root caries and other oral health issues. Their dependence on staff to assist them with daily oral hygiene care often results in minimal hygiene being provided. Oral health requirements are often unfortunately overshadowed by more important things such as feeding, toileting and bathing. Other barriers that care staff in residential aged care facilities experience to providing oral care included lack of oral health policies, and ongoing education and training.

Historically there has been a reluctance with dental professionals to attend residential aged-care facilities. When combined with the difficulty experienced for residents to access dental care themselves, their options have been limited. Therefore, the need for regular onsite professional dental care is urgently required, to address early detection, prevention and treatment of oral health problems.

Maintaining the oral health of residents in residential care facilities requires a multidisciplinary approach to address these issues. The incorporation of the oral health therapist into the residential aged care facility, as part of a multidisciplinary approach with nursing staff, is suggested to demonstrate an effective and efficient use of health resources. The oral health therapist can provide individualized oral hygiene care plans, routine dental care, and help provide education, preventative programmes and ongoing support and motivation to nursing staff.

Having the oral health therapist implement and manage an oral health training programme that is then executed by a registered nurse, who is the oral health leader, and who has received oral health education by the oral health therapist. They are then able to carry out and enforce the programme whilst the oral health therapist is not there. This would encourage better integration, education and motivation of nurses and care staff into oral hygiene care delivery. Increasing the ability and confidence of staff when performing oral health care for residents and being able to identify oral health care problems when they arise. The emphasis needs to be on good end of life oral care, through prevention and maintenance rather than advanced dental treatments. This is where the oral health therapist could fill that niche in residential care facilities.

== Barriers to effective cleaning ==
An ageing population involving an increased retention of teeth, often with complex restorations, is expected to increase the demand for dental care in older people. As people age they attend dental services less frequently, and face a number of barriers to accessing dental care. This involves clinics not being easily accessible for frail, disabled or functionally dependent elderly who have limited mobility, and are wheelchair dependent and/or cognitively impaired. Access is often even more difficult for elderly residing in residential aged care facilities.

As people age and become frail, disabled or functionally dependent, their oral health is put at great risk, due to a variety of health problems or disabilities that impact on the ability for them to provide their own oral cares. This may be related to issues that are associate with:

- Cognitive impairment – such as Dementia and Alzheimers which results in uncooperative behaviour due to confusional states
- Functional limitations – such as poor dexterity, strength or pain resulting from hand and upper limb dysfunction, and diminished eyesight
- Functional problems - such as swallowing difficulties or tongue and mouth movements.

== Dentures and Edentulism ==
=== Edentulism ===
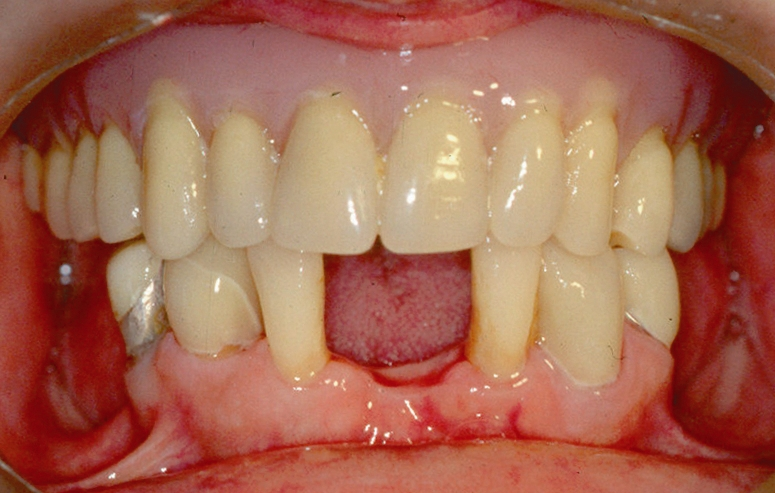
Intra-oral photograph showing full upper denture and natural lower teeth with mandibular central incisors missing

Edentulism is the result of a mostly preventable oral disease process that is a worldwide public health concern. The loss of the permanent dentition is a multi-factorial process resulting from the impact of dental caries, periodontal disease and social factors. People who have lost teeth are referred to as (either partially or completely) edentulous (edentate), however those who have not lost teeth are referred to as dentate.

==== Functions of Teeth ====
- Support the lips and cheeks, providing for a fuller, more aesthetically pleasing appearance
- Maintain an individual's bite or occlusion
- Along with the tongue and lips, assist with proper pronunciation of words
- Preserve/maintain the height of the alveolar ridge
- Mastication of food

==== Consequences Of Edentulism ====
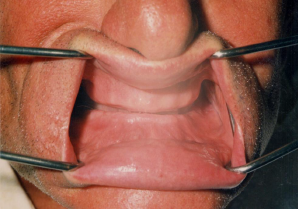
Extra-oral photograph showing a completely edentulous maxillary and mandibular arch

- Resorption of alveolar ridge
- Reduced chewing efficiency & Limitation of food selection
- Speech impairment
- Change in appearance
- Psychosocial impact
- Reduced quality of life

==== Why Replace A Missing Tooth/Teeth? ====
- Aesthetics
- Improved function
  - Mastication
  - Speech
- Prevention of food packing and mucosal trauma
- Space maintenance
- Alveolar bone maintenance
- Reestablishment of occlusion and prevention of malocclusion
- Reduce load on remaining teeth

=== Dentures ===
Dentures are prosthetic appliances fabricated to fill the gaps of missing teeth. Conventional style dentures are removable appliances and are designed to be either a complete denture or a partial denture anchoring to adjacent teeth. There are many denture designs, some which rely on chemical bonding or clasping onto teeth or attached via dental implants known as fixed prosthodontics.

==== Denture Cleaning ====
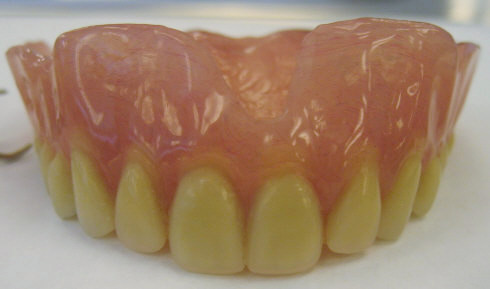
Full acrylic removable upper/maxillary denture

- Remove denture whenever possible (especially overnight and keep in a dry and safe place)
- Remove/rinse denture and mouth after eating
- Use soft denture brush with non-abrasive dentifrice
- Clean over sink filled with water
- Soak denture in appropriate solution (e.g. Polident) daily
- Bleach or vinegar can be used to remove stains (heavily diluted with water in the ratio 10:1)
- Concentrated bleach solutions can cause
  - Changes in colouration of acrylic
  - Darkening and/or damage of base

==== Common Denture Concerns ====
- Denture stomatitis (redness/inflammation due to denture not being removed especially at night)
- Poor oral hygiene practices
- "Sore spots" due to dentures ill-fitting and rubbing resulting in ulcers etc.
- Loss of retention (therefore resulting in a reline of denture or a remake may be required)
- Fractures due to dropping dentures (Acrylic resin can be repaired easily however metal based or chrome cobalt dentures will require soldering or remake as much harder to add teeth too.

== Practical suggestions ==
People are now living longer and retaining their teeth for longer due to the preventive focused approach to dentistry. Although the rates of edentulism are rapidly declining, this is resulting in the number of natural teeth retained in the dentition. The impact of this is especially apparent in the residential care setting, as Personal Care Assistant staff are often time poor as a high resident to PCA ratio, oral care is often not adequately attended too or not at all. Residential care facilities will continue to encounter residents retaining their own natural teeth as the population is growing and living for longer periods so an oral health intervention will be required to combat this area of care that is severely lacking in many facilities. Utilising Oral Health Therapists in this sector would provide some assistance in closing the gap.

=== Management of Geriatric Patients ===
- Developing a routine with oral hygiene care at the same time every day with the patients input as to when is most convenient
- Undertaking oral care in a quiet distraction-free environment
- Use of short, simple sentences and directions
- Use of task-breakdown and one-step instructions placement of a step by step poster illustrating each step
- Use of non-verbal cues e.g. facial expressions, hand gestures, body language (reassuring patient)
- Gentle touch to promote trust
- Using reminders and prompts for oral hygiene care
- Use of dementia communication techniques such as chaining, bridging, and rescuing applied to oral hygiene practices

== See also ==
- Dentistry
- Geriatrics
- Gerontology
- Ageing-associated diseases
- Elderly care
- Dental Specialties
- Special Need Dentistry
