= Isaac Schour =

Isaac Schour (1900, Efingar Ukraine – 1964) was a dental scholar, educator, researcher, and administrator. He is best known for his tooth development chart. By studying the histolotgic sections of the teeth of animals, he inspired a new discipline: the histo-physiology of teeth and surrounding structures.

Schour was an innovative teacher who kept dental professionals informed about research in other sciences by founding the annual Midwest Seminar of Dental Medicine. Through his efforts, dental experts escaping persecution by the Nazis in Europe came to the faculty of the University of Illinois at Chicago College of Dentistry, creating the college's international reputation.

Schour served as president of the International Association for Dental Research and head of the University of Illinois at Chicago College of Dentistry Department of Histology. He was dean of the college from 1956 to 1964.

Preceded by Allan G. Brodie	Deans of the University of Illinois at Chicago College of Dentistry; 1956-1964	Succeeded by Seymour H. Yale
