= California Dental Association =

US nonprofit professional organization

- Formation: 1870
- Type: Professional association
- Headquarters: Sacramento, California
- Location: California
- Members: 27,000
- Official language: English
- President: Max Martinez, DDS
- Executive Director: Peter DuBois
- Website: cda.org

The California Dental Association (CDA) is a nonprofit, professional organization representing organized dentistry in California. Founded in 1870, CDA’s membership currently consists of 27,000 dentists in 32 local dental societies throughout the state of California, making it the largest constituent of the American Dental Association.

CDA and its members champion proper oral health care for Californians. CDA supports dentists through resources, including education, practice support, advocacy and protection. Additionally, CDA publishes the Journal of the California Dental Association, an award-winning peer-reviewed scientific publication.

== California Dental Association Foundation ==
The CDA Foundation was formed as the philanthropic arm of the California Dental Association in 2001. The CDA Foundation provides grants and awards to dental professionals and community-based organizations, promotes oral health and education, and hosts CDA Cares dental clinics that provide dental care at no cost to Californians in need.

To date, CDA Cares has provided $25 million in care to more than 30,000 people through 16 clinics in California.

The Student Loan Repayment Grant program, which began in 2002, has placed 20 dentists into clinics where they have provided oral health services to 100,000 patients valued at more than $25 million in communities where individuals face barriers to care.
