= American Academy of Cosmetic Dentistry =

The American Academy of Cosmetic Dentistry (AACD), founded in December 1984 by Jack Kammer and Jeff Morley of San Francisco, is a cosmetic dental organization. The academy has been surveying "American patients regarding esthetic dentistry and their personal preferences" since its inception.

By 2001, the academy had members from 40 countries. Between 2000 and 2007, membership in the organization grew by 70%.

== Executives ==
Presidents of the academy serve one-year terms. Ken Glick of Toronto, Canada, served as the president in 1998. Mike Malone was elected vice president in 2001 and "will automatically ascend to President in two years." Wynn Okuda was the 'president elect' in late 2002. Laura Kelly of California became the academy's first female president in 2007. Kelly was followed in 2008 by Mickey Bernstein of Tennessee.

== American Academy of Cosmetic Dentistry’s Charitable Foundation ==
The American Academy of Cosmetic Dentistry's Charitable Foundation (AACDCF) maintains three programs: Give Back A Smile, the Give Back A Smile Whitening Program, and the Disaster Relief Fund.
