= New York State Dental Association =

Association (founded 1868)

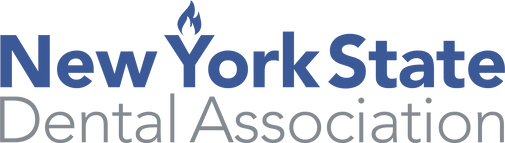
- Founded: 1868; 158 years ago
- Type: Professional association
- Headquarters: Albany, NY
- Location: USA
- Members: 12,000
- President: Maurice Edwards, DMD
- Executive Director: Michael Herrmann
- Website: Official Website

The New York State Dental Association or NYSDA was founded in 1868 and consists of 12,000 dentists practicing dentists in the New York state. NYSDA provides its members with a powerful presence in the New York State Legislature, business development programs, peer review, a clinical journal and educational and scientific programs that promote the art and science of dentistry. NYSDA is one of the largest state constituents of the American Dental Association and is composed of 13 local component societies.

It also publishes the New York State Dental Journal, a peer-reviewed clinical dental journal, and NYSDA News, a newsletter about association programs and events.
