= Florida Dental Association =

US health organization

The Florida Dental Association (also abbreviated as FDA) is an organization of dentists in Florida, United States, and it was established in 1884. Currently, there are approximately 7,000 members in the FDA.
