= Condensing osteitis =

Hardening of tooth roots due to infection

- Other names: focal sclerosing osteomyelitis
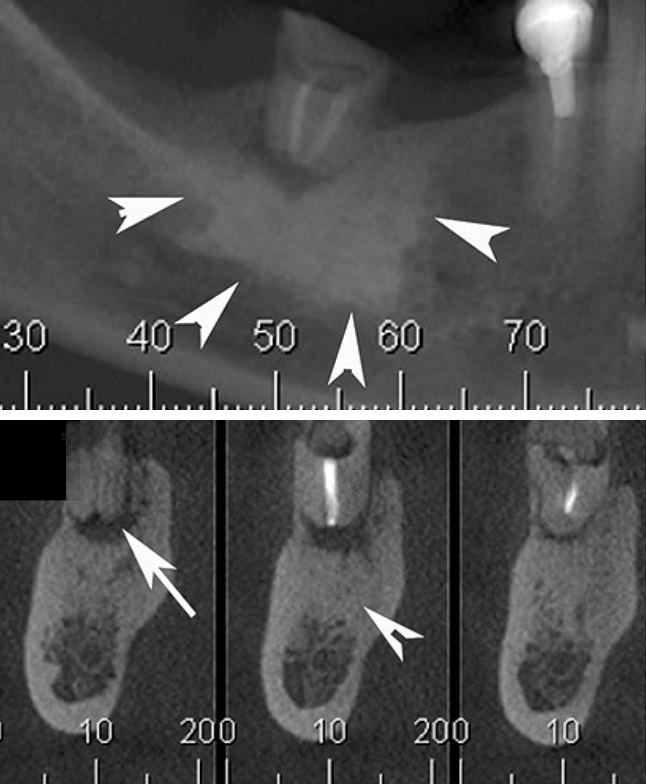
- Cone beam CT scan presenting a diffuse hyperdense lesion in the apex of a mandibular molar (arrowhead, top) adjacent to an inflammatory periapical lesion (arrow, bottom).
- Specialty: Dentistry

Condensing osteitis, also known as focal sclerosing osteomyelitis, is a rare periapical inflammatory condition characterized by the formation of sclerotic bone near the roots of premolars and molars. This condition arises as a response to dental infections, such as periapical pulp inflammation or low-intensity trauma. The lesion typically appears as a radiopacity in the periapical area due to the sclerotic reaction. While most commonly associated with non-vital teeth, condensing osteitis can also occur in vital teeth following occlusal trauma. The condition was first described by Dr. Carl Garré in 1893.

== Signs and symptoms ==
Patients are typically asymptomatic, and the condition is most often detected incidentally during routine radiographic examinations. In rare symptomatic cases, patients may report mild pain.

== Causes ==
The cause of condensing osteitis is not clear, but it is thought to happen due to irritation or inflammation that increases osteoblastic activity.

Chronic pulpitis is one of the main factors. This is when bacteria enters the pulp of the tooth, often from untreated cavities. This leads to ongoing mild inflammation that causes bone growth near the root of the tooth. Another main factor is periapical infections. These infections start at the tip of the tooth root, often from dead pulp tissue or occlusal trauma.

== Pathophysiology ==
Condensing osteitis happens when the bone around the tooth reacts to long-term inflammation. This involves excessive bone growth, leading to the formation of sclerotic bone in the jaw.

Ongoing tooth infections, like pulpitis, release chemicals that attract immune cells and activate osteoblasts. Osteoblasts create extra bone in response to inflammation, making the area look more sclerotic. Unlike typical infections, condensing osteitis doesn't destroy bone or produce pus it just adds more bone to the affected area.

== Diagnosis ==
Diagnosis typically involves a clinical examination by a dentist or endodontist, complemented by imaging studies such as cone-beam computed tomography. Radiographically, condensing osteitis presents as a localized radiopaque lesion at the root apex of the affected tooth.

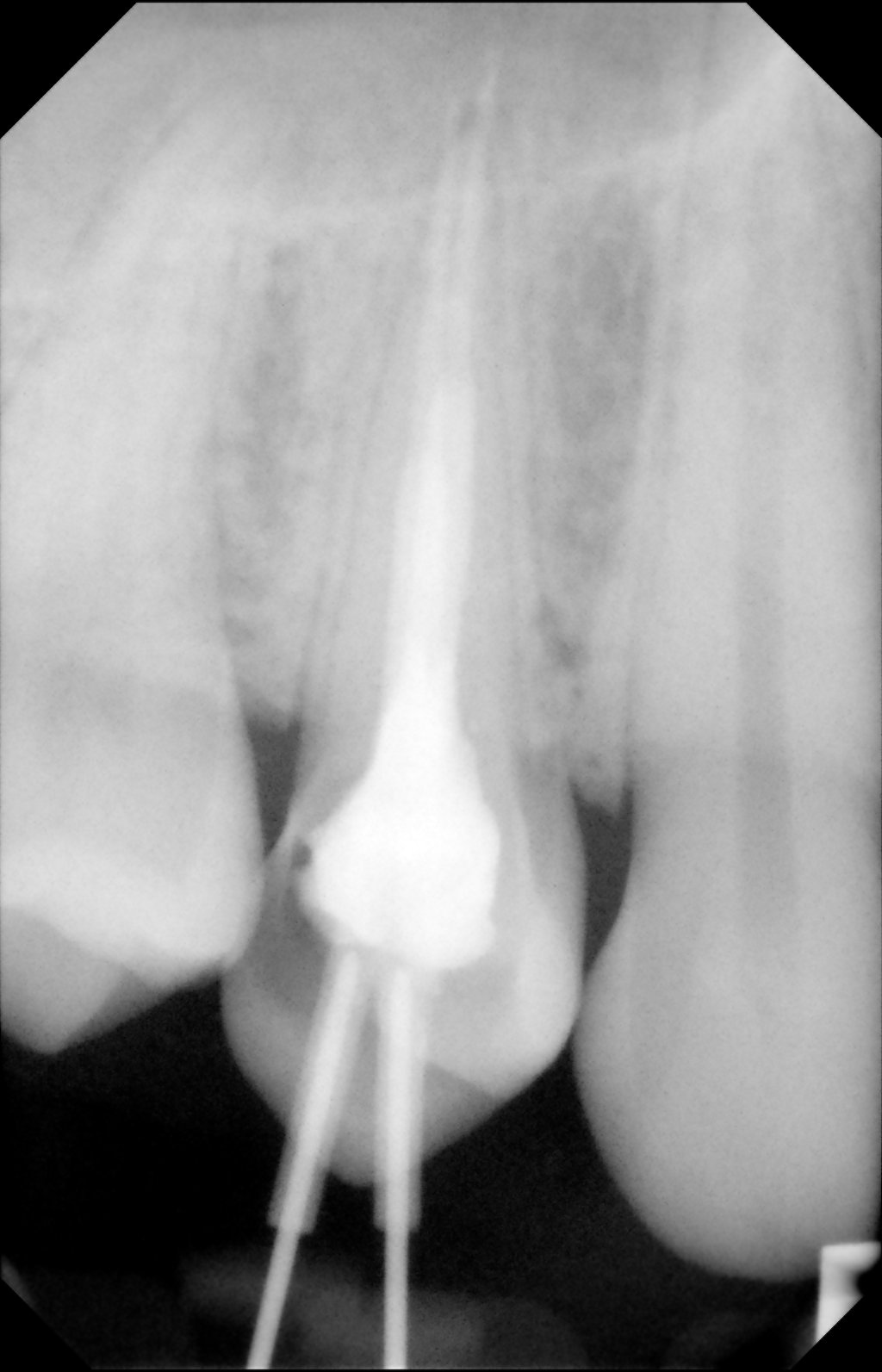
Root canal treatment by Endodontist

== Treatment ==
Condensing osteitis is usually benign and asymptomatic. Treatment depends on the underlying cause and severity. Endodontic treatment is the primary intervention in cases of pulpal infection. Other treatment options include Antibiotics that are prescribed for associated bacterial infections and tooth Extraction: Reserved for cases where the tooth is irreversibly damaged due to pulpitis.

== Prognosis ==
The prognosis is excellent. Following root canal therapy, the sclerotic bone often remodels, restoring normal bone structure over time.

== Epidemiology ==
This affects 4-7% of the human population. It mainly occurs during early adolescence/young adults but can occur at any age and in any gender.

== Research direction ==
Recent research has focused on the prevalence and management of condensing osteitis and thus has pointed out the need for further investigation into its pathophysiology and treatment. For instance, studies on the frequency and distribution of mandibular condensing osteitis in specific populations, such as the Taiwanese population, have provided useful epidemiological data. These studies indicate that prevalence may be related to cultural, dietary, or even genetic factors, thus constituting a background for conducting research in different population groups.

Case reports, such as the documentation of a female patient aged 35 years with condensing osteitis, further support that there is variability in clinical presentation and outcome. These cases serve to further the understanding not only of the condition itself but also the deficits in both diagnostic and therapeutic approaches, underlining the need for individual treatment strategies, as well as follow-up over a long period of time regarding changes in bone after intervention.

Future studies may be directed at the molecular mechanisms of osteoblastic activity and bone sclerotization in response to chronic inflammation. Identifying specific inflammatory or genetic markers may lead to earlier diagnosis and targeted therapies. Clinical practices may also be greatly improved by investigating the place of advanced imaging technologies, such as cone-beam computed tomography, in enhancing diagnostic accuracy and monitoring treatment outcomes.

Condensing osteitis will be more clearly understood when epidemiological data is combined with clinical case studies and molecular research to enhance patient care and outcomes by both dental and medical specialties.
