= Glandular odontogenic cyst =

Human jaw cyst

- Other names: Sialo-Odontogenic cyst
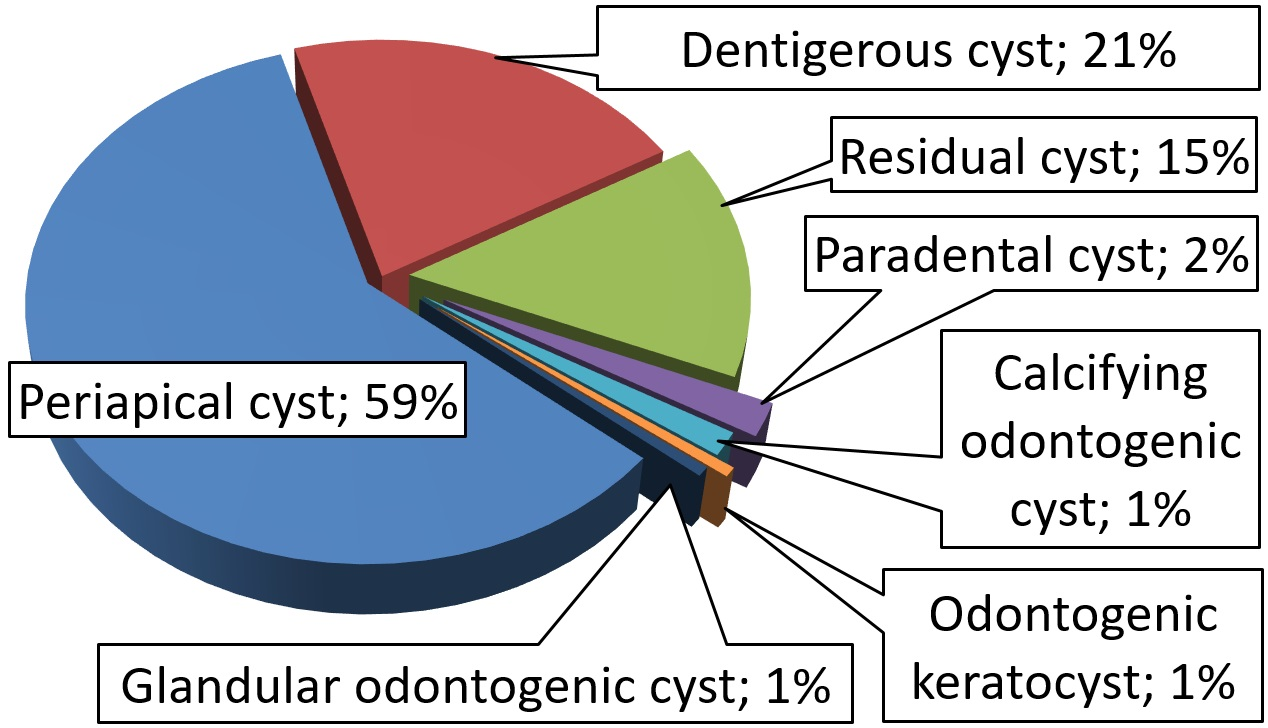
- Relative incidence of odontogenic cysts. Glandular odontogenic cyst is labeled at bottom.
- Symptoms: Jaw expansion, swelling, impairment to the tooth, root and cortical plate
- Causes: Cellular mutation, cyst maturation at glandular, BCL-2 protein
- Diagnostic method: Biopsy, CT scans, Panoramic x-rays
- Differential diagnosis: Central mucoepidermoid carcinoma, odontogenic keratocyst
- Prevention: Post-surgery follow-ups are commonly proposed to prevent the chances of recurrence
- Treatment: Enucleation, curettage, marginal or partial resection, marsupialization
- Frequency: 0.12 to 0.13% of people

A glandular odontogenic cyst (GOC) is a rare and usually benign odontogenic cyst developed at the odontogenic epithelium of the mandible or maxilla. Originally, the cyst was labeled as "sialo-odontogenic cyst" in 1987. However, the World Health Organization (WHO) decided to adopt the medical expression "glandular odontogenic cyst". Following the initial classification, only 60 medically documented cases were present in the population by 2003. GOC was established as its own biological growth after differentiation from other jaw cysts such as the "central mucoepidermoid carcinoma (MEC)", a popular type of neoplasm at the salivary glands. GOC is usually misdiagnosed with other lesions developed at the glandular and salivary gland due to the shared clinical signs. The presence of osteodentin supports the concept of an odontogenic pathway. This odontogenic cyst is commonly described to be a slow and aggressive development. The inclination of GOC to be large and multilocular is associated with a greater chance of remission. GOC is an infrequent manifestation with a 0.2% diagnosis in jaw lesion cases. Reported cases show that GOC mainly impacts the mandible and male individuals. The presentation of GOC at the maxilla has a very low rate of incidence. The GOC development is more common in adults in their fifth and sixth decades.

GOC has signs and symptoms of varying sensitivities, and dysfunction. In some cases, the GOC will present no classic abnormalities and remains undiagnosed until secondary complications arise. The proliferation of GOC requires insight into the foundations of its unique histochemistry and biology. The comparable characteristics of GOC with other jaw lesions require the close examination of its histology, morphology, and immunocytochemistry for a differential diagnosis. Treatment modes of the GOC follow a case-by-case approach due to the variable nature of the cyst. The selected treatment must be accompanied with an appropriate pre and post-operative plan.

== Signs and symptoms ==
The appearance of a protrusive growth will be present at their mandible or maxilla. The expansive nature of this cyst may destruct the quality of symmetry at the facial region and would be a clear physical sign of abnormality. The area of impact may likely be at the anterior region of mandible as described in a significant number of reported cases. At this region, GOC would eventually mediate expansion at the molars. A painful and swollen sensation at the jaw region caused by GOC may be reported. Detailing of a painless feeling or facial paraesthesia can be experienced. Alongside GOC, "root resorption, cortical bone thinning and perforation, and tooth displacement may occur". Experience of swelling at the buccal and lingual zones can occur. Usually, the smaller sized GOCs present no classical signs or symptoms to the case (i.e. "asymptomatic"). GOC is filled with cystic a fluid that differs in viscosity and may appear as transparent, brownish-red, or creamy in colour.

== Causes ==
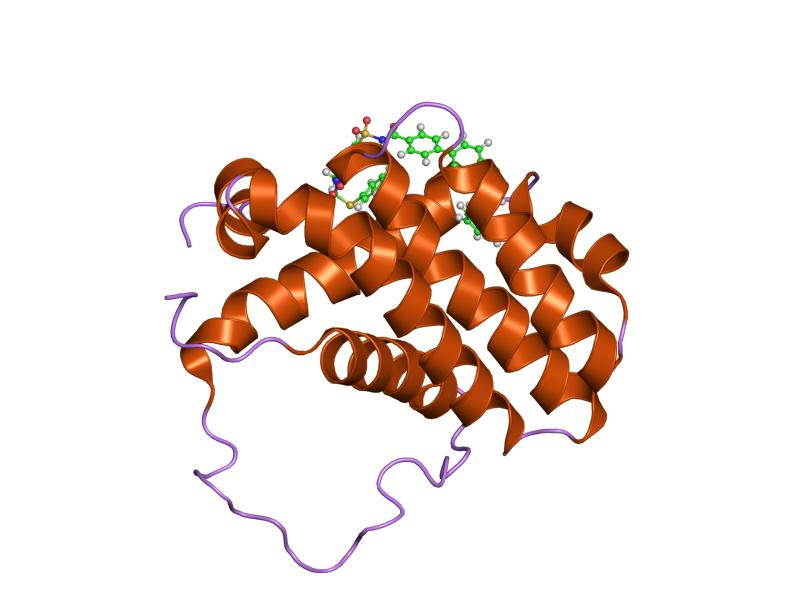
The molecular arrangement of BCL-2 protein, a potential cause to the development of the GOC. The protein can inhibit the process of apoptosis when at a high abundance.

The GOC can arise through a number of causes:

The origin of the GOC can be understood through its biological and histochemistry foundations. It has been suggested that GOC can be a result of a traumatic event. The occurrence of GOC may be from a mutated cell from "the oral mucosa and the dental follicle" origin. Another probable cause is from pre-existing cysts or cancerous constituents. A potential biological origin of GOC is a cyst developed at a salivary gland or simple epithelium, which undergoes maturation at the glandular. Another origin is a primordial cyst that infiltrates the glandular epithelial tissue through a highly organised cellular differentiation. Pathologists discovered a BCL-2 protein, commonly present in neoplasms, to exist in the tissue layers of the GOC. The protein is capable of disrupting normal cell death function at the odontogenic region. The analysis of PTCH, a gene that specialises in neoplasm inhibition, was carried out to determine if any existing mutations played a role in the initiation of the GOC. It is confirmed that the gene had no assistance in triggering cystic advancement.

== Diagnosis ==
=== Radiology ===
The performance of radiographic imaging i.e. computed tomography, at the affected area is considered essential. Radiographic imaging of the GOC can display a defined unilocular or multilocular appearance that may be "rounded or oval" shaped upon clinical observation. Scans may present a distribution of the GOC at the upper jaw as it presents a 71.8% prevalence in cases. The margin surrounding the GOC is usually occupied with a scalloped definition. A bilateral presentation of the GOC is possible but is not common at either the maxilla or mandible sites. The GOC has an average size of 4.9 cm that can develop over the midline when positioned at the mandible or maxilla region. Analysis of scans allow for the differentiation of GOC from other parallel lesions, i.e. "ameloblastoma, odontogenic myxoma, or dentigerous cyst" in order to minimise the chance of a misdiagnosis. These scans can display the severity of cortical plate, root, and tooth complications, which is observed to determine the necessary action for reconstruction.

=== Histology ===
Histological features related to the GOC differ in each scenario; however, there is a general criterion to identify the cyst. The GOC usually features a "stratified squamous epithelium" attached to connective tissue that is filled with active immune cells. The lining of the epithelium features a very small diameter that is usually non-keratinised. In contrast, the lining of the GOC has rather an inconsistent diameter. The basal cells of the GOC usually has no association to a cancerous origin. Tissue cells can be faced with an abnormal increase in the concentration of calcium, which can cause the region to calcify. The transformation of the epithelium is associated with a focal luminal development. Eosinophilic organelles such as columnar and cuboidal cells can be observed during microscopy. Intra-epithelial crypts may be identified in the internal framework of the epithelium or at the external space where it presents itself as papillae protrusions. Mucin is observable after the application of "alcian blue dye" on the tissue specimen. The histological observation of goblet cells is a common feature with the "odontogenic dentigerous cyst". In some circumstances, the epithelium can have variable plaque structures that appear as swirls in the tissue layers. Interestingly, histologists were able to identify hyaline bodies within the tissue framework of the GOC. It is encouraged that the histological identification of at least seven of these biological characteristics is required to accurately distinguish the presence of the GOC.

==== Intraepithelial Hemosiderin ====
Pathologists have identified hemosiderin pigments that are considered unique to the GOC. The discovery of this pigment can be pivotal to the differentiation of the GOC from other lesions. The staining at the epithelium is due to the haemorrhaging of the lining. The cause of the haemorrhaging can be triggered by the type of treatment, cellular degradation, or structural deformation inflicted during GOC expansion. Examination of the GOC tissue section indicated that red blood cells from the intraluminal space had combined with the extracellular constituents. This process is carried out through transepithelial elimination. This clinical procedure is beneficial to confirm the benign or malignant nature of the GOC.

=== Immunocytochemistry ===
The examination of cytokeratin profiles is deemed useful when observing the differences between the GOC and the central MEC. These two lesions show individualised expression for cytokeratin 18 and 19. Past studies observed Ki-67, p53, and PCNA expression in common jaw cysts that shared similar characteristics. There was a lack of p53 expression found in radicular cysts. Similarly, Ki-67 was seen less in the central MEC compared to the other lesions, though this discovery is not essential to the process of differential diagnosis. Proliferating cell nuclear antigen readings were established to have no role in the differentiation process. The TGF-beta marker is present in the GOC and can explain the limited concentration of normal functioning cells.

==== MAML2 rearrangement ====
The observation of a MAML2 rearrangement is described as a procedure useful in the differential diagnosis of the GOC and its closely related lesion, the central MEC. A second cystic development displayed the presence of CRTC3-MAML2 fusion after an in-vitro application. The MAML2 rearrangement represents the developmental growth of the central MEC from the GOC. The use of fusion-gene transcript may be helpful towards the differentiation of the GOC from the central MEC of the jaw and salivary glands.

== Treatment ==
=== Pre-treatment protocols ===
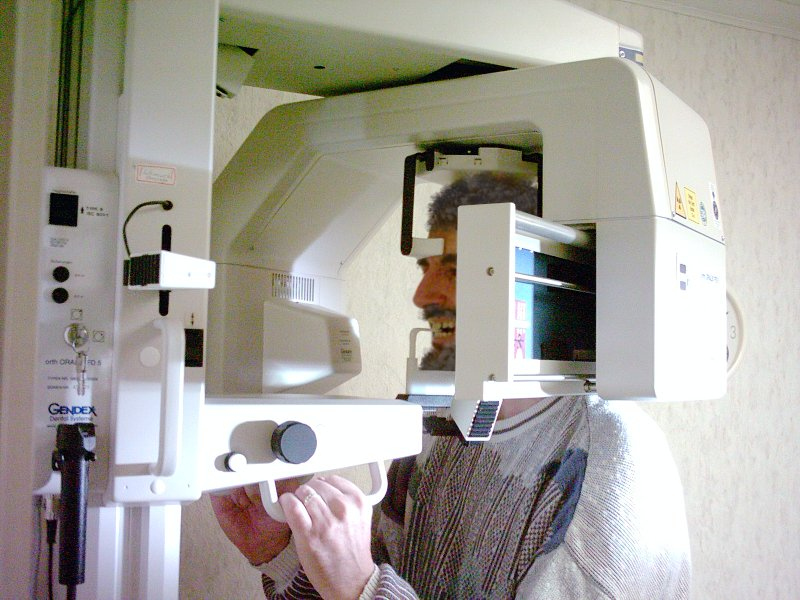
Panoramic radiography used to provide visualisations of the maxilla and mandible. X-rays will display the degree of impact on case, caused by the GOC.

A computed tomography and panoramic x-ray must be undertaken in order to observe the severity of internal complications. These scans allow for the observation of the GOC size, radiolucency, cortical bone, dentition, root, and vestibular zone. In some cases, the dentition may be embedded into the cavity walls of the lesion, depending on the position of expansion at the odontogenic tissue. The diagnosis of a smaller sized GOC is related to the attachment of only two teeth. While, a greater sized GOC develops over two teeth. Presentation of a greater sized lesion usually requires a biopsy for a differential diagnosis and a precise treatment plan.

=== Treatment process ===
The unilocular and multilocular nature is imperative to the determination of treatment style. Local anesthesia is regularly provided as the GOC is embedded within the tissue structure of the jaw and requires an invasive procedure for a safe and accurate extraction. For unilocular GOCs with minimal tissue deterioration, "enucleation, curettage, and marsupialization" is a suitable treatment plan. Notably, the performance of enucleation or curettage as the primary action is linked to an incomplete extraction of the GOC and is only recommended to the less invasive lesions. Multilocular GOCs require a more invasive procedure such as "peripheral ostectomy, marginal resection, or partial jaw resection". GOCs associated with a more severe structural damage are encouraged to undergo marsupialization as either an initial or supplementary surgery. The frequency of reappearance is likely due to the lingering cystic tissue structures that remain after the performance of curettage. The incorporation of a "dredging method i.e. repetition of enucleation and curettage" is also suggested until the remnants of the GOC diminishes for certain. The treatment ensures scar tissue is removed to promote the successful reconstruction of osseous material for jaw preservation. Alongside the main treatments, bone allograft application, cryosurgery, and apicoectomy are available but have not been consistently recommended. Though Carnoy's solution, the chloroform-free version, is recommended with the treatment as it degenerates the majority of the damaged dental lamina. The most effective type of treatment remains unknown due to the lack of detailed data from reported cases.

=== Post-treatment protocols ===
Follow-up appointments are necessary after the removal of the GOC as there is a high chance of remission, which may be exacerbated in cases dealing with "cortical plate perforation". The GOC has a significant remission rate of 21 to 55% that can potentially develop during the period of 0.5 to 7 years post-surgery. Cases occupied with a lower risk lesion are expected to continue appointments with physicians for up to 3 years post-surgery. A higher risk lesion is encouraged to consistently consult with physicians during a 7-year period after treatment. Remission events require immediate attention and appropriate procedures such as enucleation or curettage. In more damaging cases of remission, tissue resection, and marsupialization may have to be performed.

== Epidemiology ==
The clinical presentation of the GOC is very low in the population as noted by the 0.12 to 0.13% occurrence rate, extrapolated from a sample size of the 181 individuals. The GOC mainly affects older individuals in the population, especially those that are in their 40 to 60s. However, the GOC can affect younger individuals i.e. 11, and more older individuals i.e. 82 in the population. The age distribution starts at a much lower number for people living in Asia and Africa. Those in their first 10 years of life have not been diagnosed with the GOC. The GOC does present a tendency to proliferate in more males than females. There is no definitive conclusion towards the relevance of gender and its influence on the rate of incidence.

== Bibliography ==
- AbdullGaffar, Badr; Koilelat, Mohamed (May 2017). "Glandular Odontogenic Cyst: The Value of Intraepithelial Hemosiderin". International Journal of Surgical Pathology. 25 (3): 250–252. doi:10.1177/1066896916672333. PMID 27829208. S2CID 46588216.
- Akkaş, İsmail; Toptaş, Orçun; Özan, Fatih; Yılmaz, Fahri (1 March 2015). "Bilateral Glandular Odontogenic Cyst of Mandible: A Rare Occurrence". Journal of Maxillofacial and Oral Surgery. 14 (1): 443–447. doi:10.1007/s12663-014-0668-y. PMC 4379287. PMID 25848155.
- Alaeddini, Mojgan; Eshghyar, Nosratollah; Etemad-Moghadam, Shahroo (2017). "Expression of podoplanin and TGF-beta in glandular odontogenic cyst and its comparison with developmental and inflammatory odontogenic cystic lesions". Journal of Oral Pathology & Medicine. 46 (1): 76–80. doi:10.1111/jop.12475. PMID 27391558. S2CID 40879254.
- Borges, Leandro Bezerra; Fechine, Francisco Vagnaldo; Mota, Mário Rogério Lima; Sousa, Fabrício Bitu; Alves, Ana Paula Negreiros Nunes (March 2012). "Odontogenic lesions of the jaw: a clinical-pathological study of 461 cases". Revista Gaúcha de Odontologia. 60 (1): 71–78. S2CID 46982083.
- Cano, Jorge; Benito, Dulce María; Montáns, José; Rodríguez-Vázquez, José Francisco; Campo, Julián; Colmenero, César (1 July 2012). "Glandular odontogenic cyst: Two high-risk cases treated with conservative approaches". Journal of Cranio-Maxillofacial Surgery. 40 (5): e131 – e136. doi:10.1016/j.jcms.2011.07.005. PMID 21865053.
- Faisal, Mohammad; Ahmad, Syed Ansar; Ansari, Uzma (September 2015). "Glandular odontogenic cyst – Literature review and report of a paediatric case". Journal of Oral Biology and Craniofacial Research. 5 (3): 219–225. doi:10.1016/j.jobcr.2015.06.011. PMC 4623883. PMID 26587384.
- Kaplan, Ilana; Gal, Gavriel; Anavi, Yakir; Manor, Ronen; Calderon, Shlomo (April 2005). "Glandular odontogenic cyst: Treatment and recurrence". Journal of Oral and Maxillofacial Surgery. 63 (4): 435–441. doi:10.1016/j.joms.2004.08.007. PMID 15789313.
- Motooka, Naomi; Ohba, Seigo; Uehara, Masataka; Fujita, Syuichi; Asahina, Izumi (1 January 2015). "A case of glandular odontogenic cyst in the mandible treated with the dredging method". Odontology. 103 (1): 112–115. doi:10.1007/s10266-013-0143-0. PMID 24374982. S2CID 21059170.
- Nagasaki, Atsuhiro; Ogawa, Ikuko; Sato, Yukiko; Takeuchi, Kengo; Kitagawa, Masae; Ando, Toshinori; Sakamoto, Shinnichi; Shrestha, Madhu; Uchisako, Kaori; Koizumi, Koichi; Toratani, Shigeaki; Konishi, Masaru; Takata, Takashi (January 2018). "Central mucoepidermoid carcinoma arising from glandular odontogenic cyst confirmed by analysis of MAML2 rearrangement: A case report: Central MEC arising from GOC". Pathology International. 68 (1): 31–35. doi:10.1111/pin.12609. PMID 29131467. S2CID 8932602.
- Neville, Brad W. (2016). "Cyst, Glandular Odontogenic". In Slootweg, Pieter (ed.). Dental and Oral Pathology. Encyclopedia of Pathology. Springer International Publishing. pp. 89–93. doi:10.1007/978-3-319-28085-1_677. ISBN 978-3-319-28084-4.
- Prabhu, Sudeendra; Rekha, K; Kumar, GS (2010). "Glandular odontogenic cyst mimicking central mucoepidermoid carcinoma". Journal of Oral and Maxillofacial Pathology. 14 (1): 12–5. doi:10.4103/0973-029X.64303. PMC 2996005. PMID 21180452.
- Momeni Roochi, Mehrnoush; Tavakoli, Iman; Ghazi, Fatemeh Mojgan; Tavakoli, Ali (1 July 2015). "Case series and review of glandular odontogenic cyst with emphasis on treatment modalities". Journal of Cranio-Maxillofacial Surgery. 43 (6): 746–750. doi:10.1016/j.jcms.2015.03.030. PMID 25971944.
- Patel, Govind; Shah, Monali; Kale, Hemant; Ranginwala, Amena (2014). "Glandular odontogenic cyst: A rare entity". Journal of Oral and Maxillofacial Pathology. 18 (1): 89–92. doi:10.4103/0973-029X.131922. PMC 4065455. PMID 24959044.
- Shah, AmishaA; Sangle, Amit; Bussari, Smita; Koshy, AjitV (2016). "Glandular odontogenic cyst: A diagnostic dilemma". Indian Journal of Dentistry. 7 (1): 38–43. doi:10.4103/0975-962X.179371. PMC 4836096. PMID 27134453.
- Shear, Mervyn; Speight, Paul, eds. (2007). "Glandular Odontogenic Cyst (Sialo-Odontogenic Cyst)". Cysts of the Oral and Maxillofacial Regions. pp. 94–99. doi:10.1002/9780470759769.ch7. ISBN 978-0-470-75976-9.
