= Odontogenic cyst =

Sac growths on the jaw bones due to tooth development

Odontogenic cysts are a group of jaw cysts that are formed from tissues involved in odontogenesis (tooth development). Odontogenic cysts are closed sacs, and have a distinct membrane derived from the rest of odontogenic epithelium. It may contain air, fluids, or semi-solid material. Intra-bony cysts are most common in the jaws, because the mandible and maxilla are the only bones with epithelial components. That odontogenic epithelium is critical in normal tooth development. However, epithelial rests may be the origin for the cyst lining later. Not all oral cysts are odontogenic cysts. For example, mucous cyst of the oral mucosa and nasolabial duct cyst are not of odontogenic origin.

In addition, there are several conditions with so-called (radiographic) 'pseudocystic appearance' in jaws; ranging from anatomic variants such as Stafne static bone cyst, to the aggressive aneurysmal bone cyst.

== Classification ==
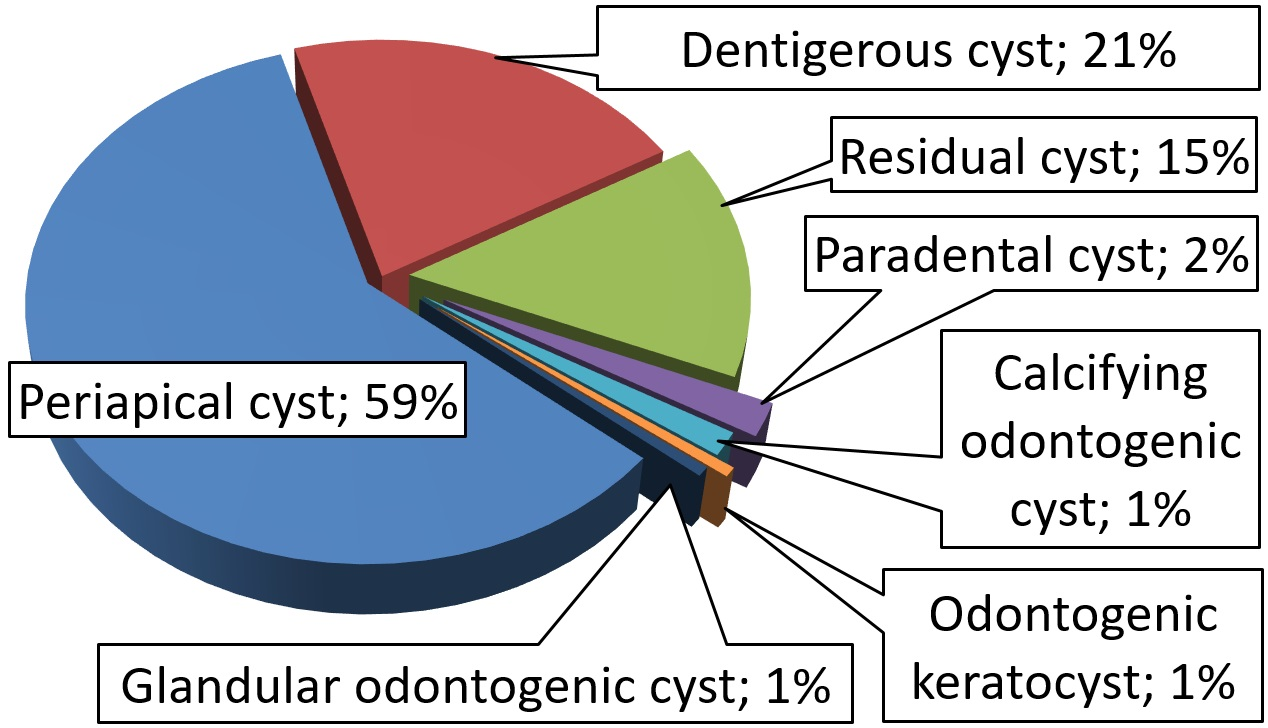
Relative incidence of odontogenic cysts

- I. Cysts of the jaws
  - A. Epithelial-lined cysts
    - 1. Developmental origin
      - (a) Odontogenic
        - i. Gingival cyst of infants
        - ii. Odontogenic keratocyst
        - iii. Dentigerous cyst
        - iv. Eruption cyst
        - v. Gingival cyst of adults
        - vi. Developmental lateral periodontal cyst
        - vii. Botryoid odontogenic cyst
        - viii. Glandular odontogenic cyst
        - ix. Calcifying odontogenic cyst
      - (b) Non-odontogenic
        - i. Midpalatal raphé cyst of infants
        - ii. Nasopalatine duct cyst
        - iii. Nasolabial cyst
    - 2. Inflammatory origin
      - i. Radicular cyst, apical and lateral
      - ii. Residual cyst
      - iii. Paradental cyst and juvenile paradental cyst
      - iv. Inflammatory collateral cyst
  - B. Non-epithelial-lined cysts
    - 1. Solitary bone cyst
    - 2. Aneurysmal bone cyst
- II. Cysts associated with the maxillary antrum
  - 1. Mucocele
  - 2. Retention cyst
  - 3. Pseudocyst
  - 4. Postoperative maxillary cyst
- III. Cysts of the soft tissues of the mouth, face and neck
  - 1. Dermoid and epidermoid cysts
  - 2. Lymphoepithelial (branchial) cyst
  - 3. Thyroglossal duct cyst
  - 4. Anterior median lingual cyst (intralingual cyst of foregut origin)
  - 5. Oral cysts with gastric or intestinal epithelium (oral alimentary tract cyst)
  - 6. Cystic hygroma
  - 7. Nasopharyngeal cyst
  - 8. Thymic cyst
  - 9. Cysts of the salivary glands: mucous extravasation cyst; mucous retention cyst; ranula; polycystic (dysgenetic) disease of the parotid
  - 10. Parasitic cysts: hydatid cyst; Cysticercus cellulosae; trichinosis
- Buccal bifurcation cyst
- Calcifying odontogenic cyst
- Dentigerous cyst (associated with the crowns of non-erupted teeth)
- Glandular odontogenic cyst
- Keratocyst (in the jaws, these can appear solitary or associated with the Gorlin-Goltz or Nevoid basal cell carcinoma syndrome.
- Paradental cyst
- Periapical cyst (The periapical cyst, otherwise known as radicular cyst, is the most common odontogenic cyst.)
- Radicular cyst (associated with the roots of non-vital teeth, also known as Periapical cyst)
- Residual cyst

== Cystic neoplasm ==
Most cysts in the body are benign (dysfunctional) tumors, the result of plugged ducts or other natural body outlets for secretions. However, sometimes these masses are considered neoplasm:

- Keratocyst
- Calcifying odontogenic cyst
  - According to the current (2005) classification of the World Health Organization, both (parakeratizied) odontogenic keratocyst and calcifying odontogenic cyst have neoplastic characteristics, thus renamed as Keratocystic odontogenic tumor and Calcifying odontogenic tumor, respectively.
- Cystic ameloblastoma
- Long standing dentigerous cyst, odontogenic keratocyst, and residual cyst may have neoplastic potential converting into the locally aggressive ameloblastoma, or the malignant squamous cell carcinoma and mucoepidermoid carcinoma.

== Diagnosis ==
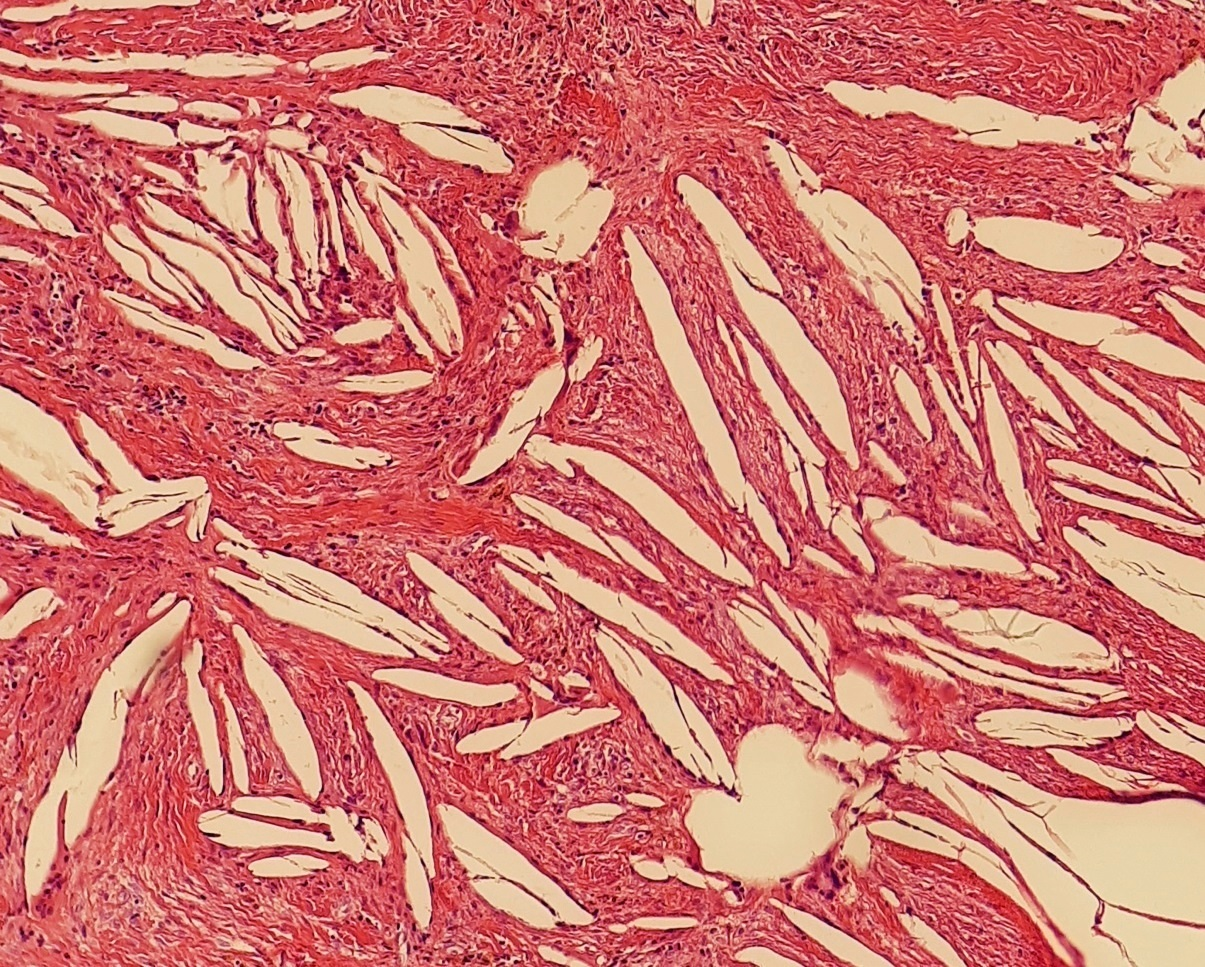
Cholesterol clefts in a periapical (radicular) cyst

On histopathology, cholesterol clefts indicate mainly a periapical (radicular) cyst or an inflamed dentigerous cyst.

== Treatment ==
Treatment ranges from simple enucleation of the cyst to curettage to resection. For example, small radicular cyst may resolved after successful endodontic ("root-canal") treatment. Because of high recurrence potential and aggressive behaviour, curettage is recommended for keratocyst. However, the conservative enucleation is the treatment of choice for most odontogenic cysts. The removed cyst must be evaluated by pathologist to confirm the diagnosis, and to rule out other neoplastic lesions with similar clinical or radiographic features (e.g., cystic or solid ameloblastoma, central mucoepidermoid carcinoma). There are cysts, e.g. buccal bifurcation cyst with self-resolation nature, in which close observation can be employed unless the cyst is infected and symptomatic.

== See also ==
- Cyst
- Mucous cyst of the oral mucosa
