= Periapical cyst =

Sac growth at the root of a tooth

- Other names: Radicular cyst, inflammatory cyst
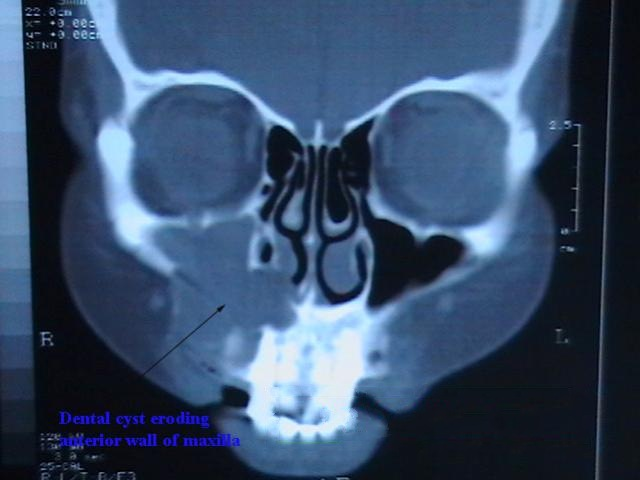
- CT scan through head showing a right periapical cyst
- Specialty: Dentistry

Commonly known as a dental cyst, the periapical cyst is the most common odontogenic cyst. It may develop rapidly from a periapical granuloma, as a consequence of untreated chronic periapical periodontitis.

Periapical is defined as "the tissues surrounding the apex of the root of a tooth" and a cyst is "a pathological cavity lined by epithelium, having fluid or gaseous content that is not created by the accumulation of pus."

Most frequently located in the maxillary anterior region, the cyst is caused by pulpal necrosis secondary to dental caries or trauma. Its lining is derived from the epithelial cell rests of Malassez which proliferate to form the cyst. Such cysts are very common. Although initially asymptomatic, they are clinically significant because secondary infection can cause pain and damage. In radiographs, the cyst appears as a radiolucency (dark area) around the apex of a tooth's root.

== Signs and symptoms ==
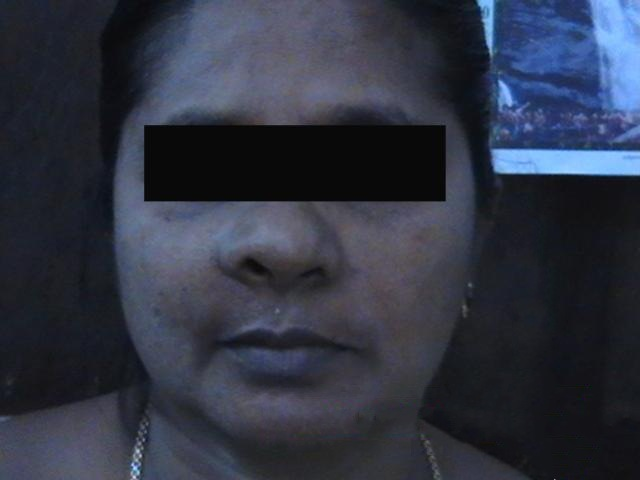
Visual image of the face of the person shown on the CT scan above. Swelling can be observed in the right cheek.

Periapical cysts begin as asymptomatic and progress slowly. Subsequent infection of the cyst causes swelling and pain. Initially, the cyst swells to a round hard protrusion, but later on the body resorbs some of the cyst wall, leaving a softer accumulation of fluid underneath the mucous membrane.

Secondary symptoms of periapical cysts include inflammation and infection of the pulp causing dental caries. This infection is what causes necrosis of the pulp.

Larger cysts may cause bone expansion or displace roots. Discoloration of the affected tooth may also occur. Patient will present negative results to electric and ice test of the affected tooth but will be sensitive to percussion. Surrounding gingival tissue may experience lymphadenopathy. The alveolar plate may exhibit crepitus when palpated.

=== Complications ===
Expansion of the cyst causes erosion of the floor of the maxillary sinus. As soon as it enters the maxillary antrum, the expansion rate increases due to available space for expansion. Performing a percussion test by tapping the affected teeth will cause shooting pain. This is often clinically diagnostic of pulpal infection.

== Causes ==
Dental cysts are usually caused due to root infection involving tooth decay. Untreated dental caries then allow bacteria to reach the level of the pulp, causing infection. The bacteria gains access to the periapical region of the tooth through deeper infection of the pulp, traveling through the roots. The resulting pulpal necrosis causes proliferation of epithelial rests of Malassez which release toxins at the apex of the tooth. The body's inflammatory response will attack the source of the toxins, leading to periapical inflammation. The many cells and proteins that rush to an area of infection create osmotic tension in the periapex which is the source of internal pressure increase at the cyst site.

These lesions can grow large because they apply pressure over the bone, causing resorption. The toxins released by the breakdown of granulation tissue are one of the common causes of bone resorption.

There are two schools of thought regarding cyst expansion.

1. Complementary response to inflammation
2. Chemical reaction with Interleukin and Prostaglandin

== Mechanisms ==
Periapical cysts develop due to an inflammatory stimulus in 3 stages:

1. Initial stage: Epithelial cells from the rests of Malassez at the apex of the roots of a non-vital tooth (one where the nerve and blood supply in the tooth have degenerated and no longer exist) become stimulated due to the body's inflammatory response to bacterial endotoxins infecting the pulp or as a direct response to necrotic pulp tissue, therefore re-entering the growth phase. Bacterial byproducts then are able to seep into the periapical region through the infected pulp.
2. Cyst development stage: Epithelial cells form strands and are attracted to the area which contains exposed connective tissue and foreign substances. Several strands from each rest converge and surround the abscess or foreign body.
3. Cyst growth stage: Fluid flows into the cavity where the forming cyst is growing due to the increased osmolality of the cavity in relation to surrounding serum in capillaries. Pressure and size increase.

The definitive mechanism by which cysts grow is under debate; several theories exist.

=== Biomechanical theory ===
Pressure and concentration differences between the cystic cavity and the growth surroundings influence fluid movement into the cyst, causing size increase.

=== Biochemical theories ===
a. Collagenase (breakdown of collagen) in the jaw bone leads to bone degeneration, providing room for cysts to develop. Substances released by the body's immune system as a result of the connective tissue breakdown, such as cytokines and growth factors, contribute to the mobilization and proliferation of epithelial cells in the area.

b. Bone resorption caused by metabolism of acidic substances produced by cysts contributes to cyst growth. Such substances include Prostaglandin-2 and Interleukin-1 which are both produced by the cyst itself.

=== Nutritional deficiency theory ===
Epithelial cells will form a mass inside the cavity and the innermost cells become deprived of nutrients because they are far from the source of nutrients (the blood vessels). The innermost cells die and form an aggregate of dead tissue. The inner cells undergo ischemic liquefactive necrosis which creates the cavity space surrounded by growing epithelial cells. This theory is unlikely in the absence of malignant transformation of epithelial cells as it does not follow the existing relationship between connective tissue and epithelium.

=== Abscess theory ===
Epithelial cells have an inherent quality to reproduce and cover any connective tissue that is not already lined with epithelia. Formation of an abscess must precede the epithelial proliferation in order for the cells to carry out this tendency. This theory explains why cysts are lined in epithelia but not why the initial cysts itself forms.

== Diagnosis ==
A non-vital tooth is necessary for the diagnosis of a periapical cyst, meaning the nerve has been removed by root canal therapy.

=== Oral examination ===
The surrounding intraoral anatomical structures should be palpated to identify the presence of bone expansion or displacement of tooth roots as well as crepitus noises during examination, indicating extensive bone damage. Bulging of the buccal or lingual cortical plates may be present. Age of occurrence in the patient, the location of the cyst, the edges of cystic contours, and the impact that the cyst has on adjacent structures must all be considered for proper diagnosis.

=== Radiology ===
Several lesions can appear similarly in radiographic appearance. Intraoral X-rays or a 3-D cone beam scan of the affected area can be used to obtain radiological images and confirm diagnosis of cysts in the periapical area. Circular or ovoid radiolucency surrounding the root tip of approximately 1-1.5 cm in diameter is indicative of the presence of a periapical cyst. The border of the cyst is seen as a narrow opaque margin contiguous with the lamina dura. In cysts that are actively enlarging, peripheral areas of the margin may not be present. Periapical cysts have a characteristic unilocular shape on radiographs. There is also a severe border of cortication between the cyst and surrounding bone. Pseudocysts, on the other hand, have a fluid filled cavity but are not lined by epithelium, therefore they have a less severe and more blurred border between the fluid and bony surroundings.

=== Histopathology ===
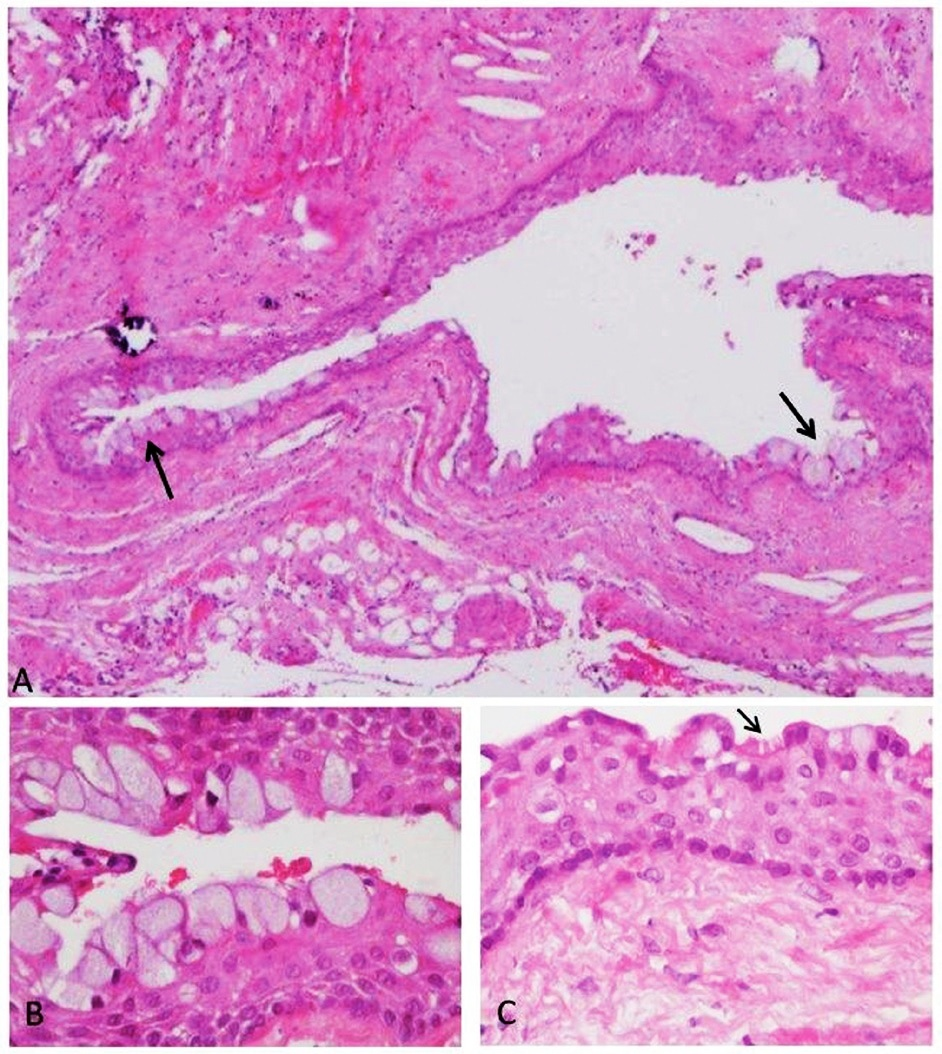
Histopathology of a periapical cyst, with metaplastic changes of mucus-secreting cells (B), and ciliated cells (C).

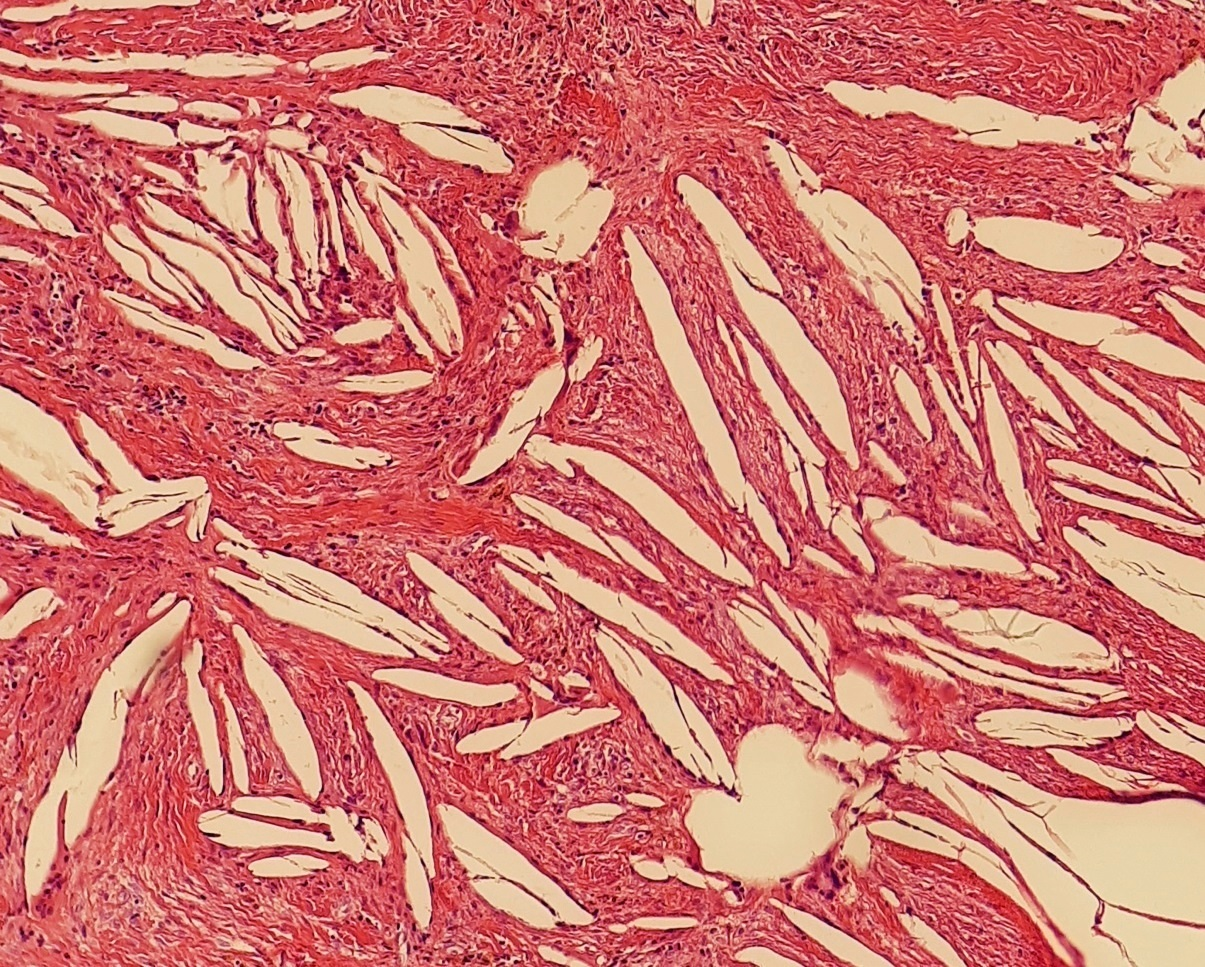
Cholesterol clefts of a periapical cyst of the jaw.

In light microscopy, periapical cysts show:

- Stratified squamous epithelium of variable thickness, except when originating in a maxillary sinus where there is respiratory epithelium (pseudostratified ciliated columnar epithelium).
- A fibrous capsule of varying thickness, with chronic inflammatory cells, wherein a plasma cells may be abundant

They sometimes have the following features:

- Rushton hyaline bodies, which are amorphic, eosinophilic, linear to crescent-shaped bodies in the cyst epithelium, present in 10% of periapical cysts.
- Scattered ciliated cells
- Cholesterol clefts in the cyst lining.

=== Classification ===
Periapical cysts exist in two structurally distinct classes:

1. Periapical true cysts - cysts containing cavities entirely surrounded in epithelial lining. Resolution of this type of cyst requires surgical treatment such as a cystectomy.
2. Periapical pocket cysts - epithelium lined cavities that have an opening to the root canal of the affected tooth. Resolution may occur after traditional root canal therapy.

=== Differentiation ===
Radiographically, it is virtually impossible to differentiate granuloma from a cyst. If the lesion is large it is more likely to be a cyst. Radiographically, both granulomas and cysts appear radiolucent. Many lesions of the mandible in particular appear cystlike in appearance. It is often necessary to obtain a biopsy and evaluate the tissue under a microscope to accurately identify the lesion.

== Treatment ==
The infected tissue of the periapical cyst must be entirely removed, including the epithelium of the cyst wall; otherwise, a relapse is likely to occur. Root canal treatment should be performed on the tooth if it is determined that previous therapy was unsuccessful. Removal of the necrotic pulp and the inflamed tissue as well as proper sealing of the canals and an appropriately fitting crown will allow the tooth to heal under uninfected conditions.

Surgical options for previously treated teeth that would not benefit from root canal therapy include cystectomy and cystostomy. This route of treatment is recommended upon discovery of the cyst after inadequate root canal treatment. A cystectomy is the removal of a cyst followed by mucosa and wound closure to reduce chances of cyst regeneration. This type of treatment is more ideal for small cysts. A cystostomy is recommended for larger cysts that compromise important adjacent anatomy. The cyst is tamponaded to allow for the cyst contents to escape the bone. Over time, the cyst decreases in size and bone regenerates in the cavity space.

Marsupialization could also be performed, which involves suturing the edges of the gingiva surrounding the cyst to remain open. The cyst then drains its contents and heal without being prematurely closed. The end result is the same as the cystostomy, bone regeneration. For both a cystostomy and marsupialization, root resectioning may also be required in cases where root resorption has occurred.

== Epidemiology ==
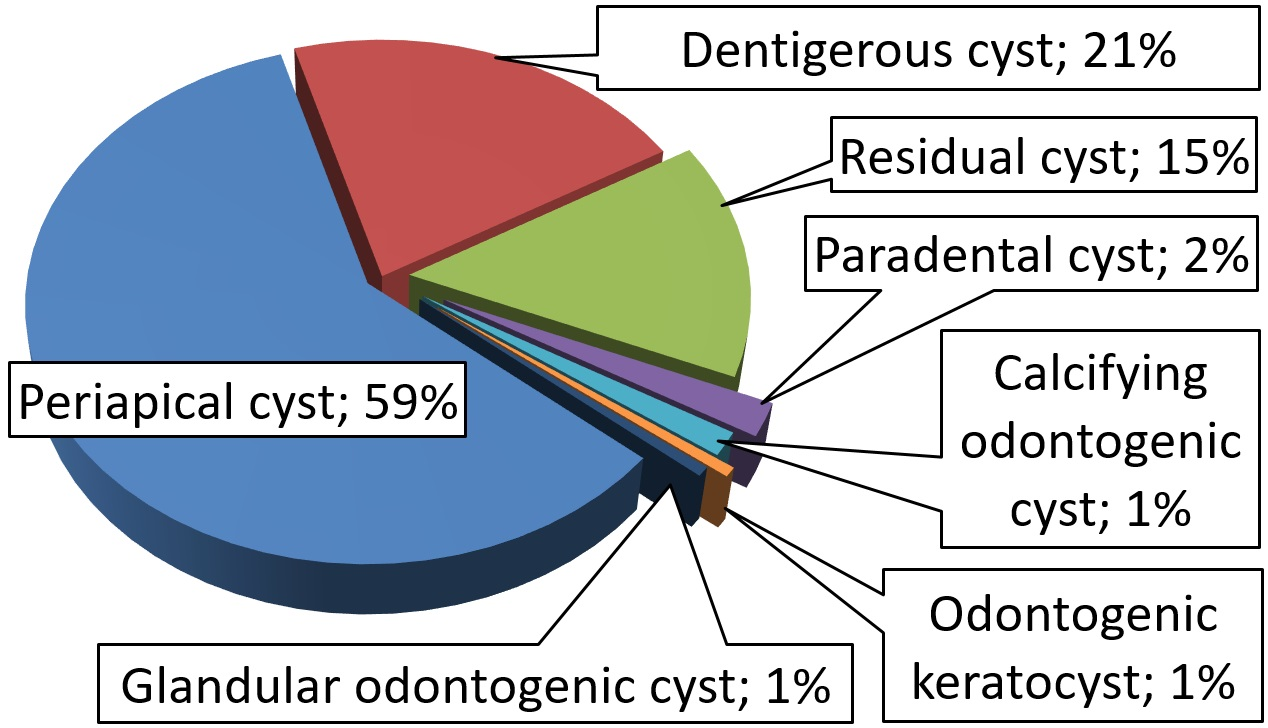
Relative incidence of odontogenic cysts. Periapical cysts are labeled at left.

Periapical cysts comprise approximately 75% of the types of cysts found in the oral region. The ratio of individuals diagnosed with periapical cysts is 3:2 male to female, as well as individuals between 20 and 60 years old. Periapical cysts occur worldwide.

Types of Periapical cysts:

Apical: 70%

Lateral: 20%

Residual: 10%
