= Paradental cyst =

Dental condition

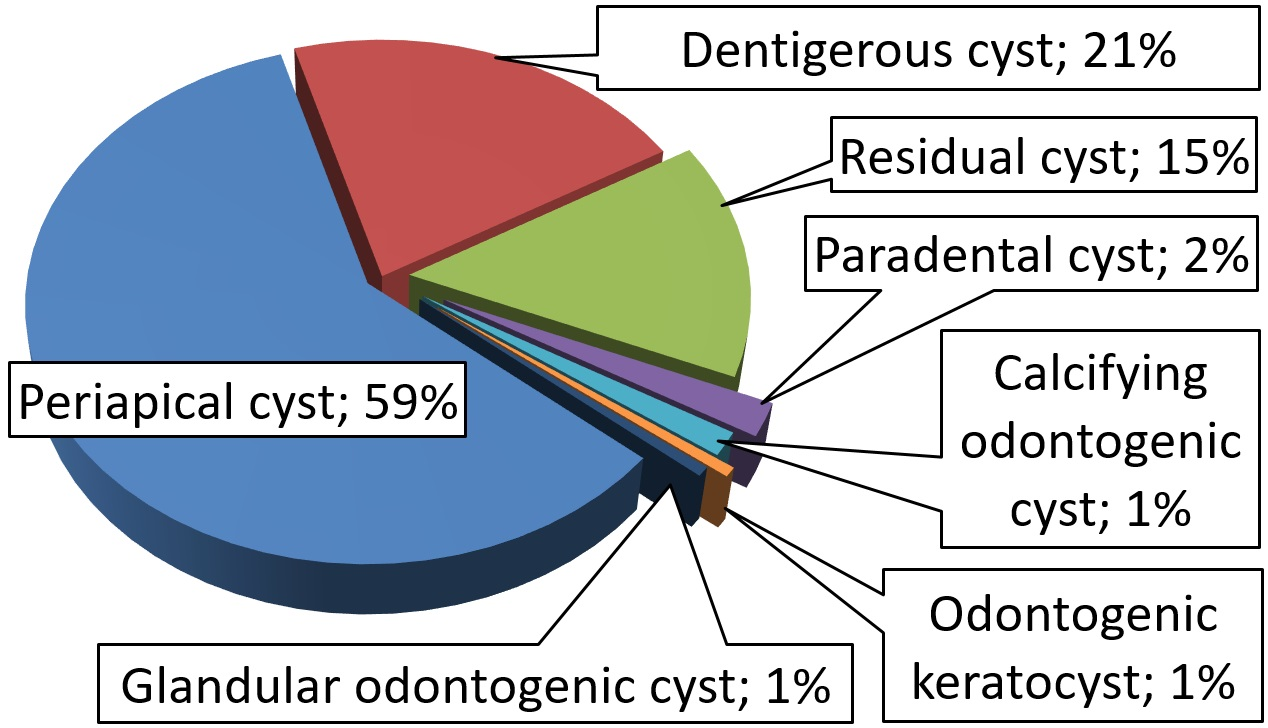
Relative incidence of odontogenic cysts. Paradental cyst is labeled at right.

Paradental cysts constitute a family of inflammatory odontogenic cysts that typically appear in relation to the crown or root of a partially erupted molar tooth. When the cyst is developed in the distal region of a partially erupted third molar, or in other locations in the dentition, it is called simply a paradental cyst, but the unique cyst that develops in the buccal bifurcation region of the mandibular first molars in the second half of the first decade of life is called a buccal bifurcation cyst and has unique clinical features and management considerations in comparison to the other paradental cysts.

== See also ==
- Cyst
