= Botryoid odontogenic cyst =

- Specialty: Dentistry

Botryoid odontogenic cyst (BOC) is a type of developmental odontogenic cyst that is extremely rare. It is thought to be a lateral periodontal cyst (LPC) variant with a higher risk of recurrence. Weathers and Waldron coined the term BOC in 1973. Adults over the age of 50 are the most affected. BOC appears as a slow-growing lesion that is symptomatic in approximately 70% of cases.

== Signs and symptoms ==
BOC patients frequently complain of swelling, as well as pain and paraesthesia. BOCs are larger cysts that range in size from 4 mm to 45 mm and can be unilocular or multilocular.

== Diagnosis ==
The BOC has a thin epithelial cyst lining composed of flattened squamous or cuboidal cells with focal plaque-like thickenings under the microscope. Clear cells may be seen in the cyst lining or among the epithelial rests dispersed among the fibrous connective-tissue wall on rare occasions.

In terms of appearance, BOC shares similarities with some odontogenic tumors such as ameloblastoma, odontogenic myxoma, adenomatoid odontogenic tumor, and others. Incisional biopsy can be used to perform preoperative differential diagnosis.

== See also ==
- Odontogenic tumor
- Lateral periodontal cyst
