= Pilomatricoma =

- Other names: Calcifying epithelioma of Malherbe, Malherbe calcifying epithelioma, and Pilomatrixoma
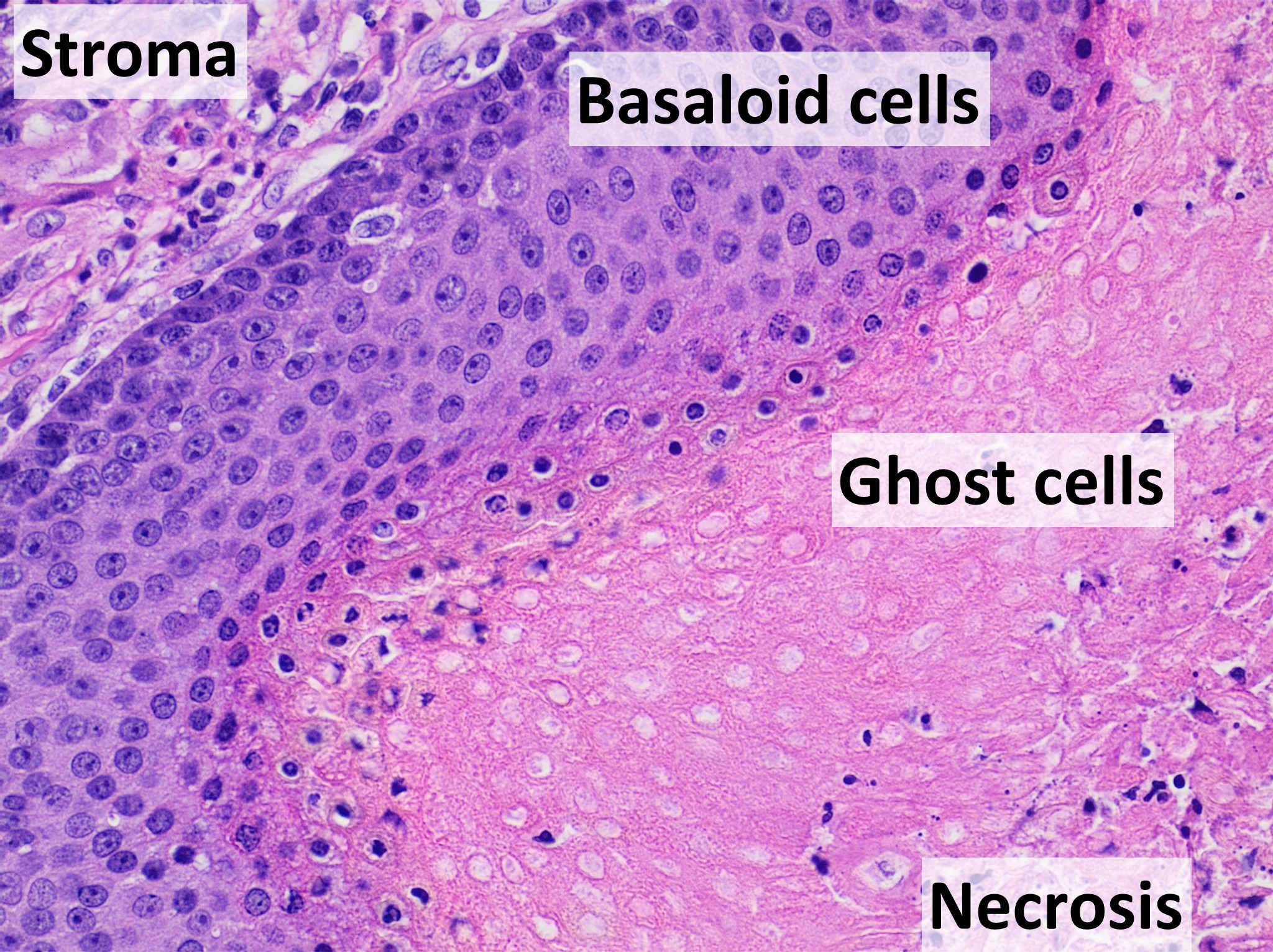
- Histopathology of pilomatricoma, high magnification, H&E stain, showing the characteristic components of basaloid cells and ghost cells.
- Specialty: Oncology

Pilomatricoma is a benign skin tumor derived from the hair matrix. These neoplasms are relatively uncommon and typically occur on the scalp, face, and upper extremities. Clinically, pilomatricomas present as a subcutaneous nodule or cyst with unremarkable overlying epidermis that can range in size from 0.5 to 3.0 cm, but the largest reported case was 24 cm.

== Presentation ==
=== Associations ===
Pilomatricomas have been observed in a variety of genetic disorders including Turner syndrome, myotonic dystrophy, Rubinstein–Taybi syndrome, trisomy 9, and Gardner syndrome. It has been reported that the prevalence of pilomatricomas in Turner syndrome is 2.6%.

Hybrid cysts that are composed of epidermal inclusion cysts and pilomatricoma-like changes have been repeatedly observed in Gardner syndrome. This association has prognostic import, since cutaneous findings in children with Gardner syndrome generally precede colonic polyposis.

== Histologic features ==
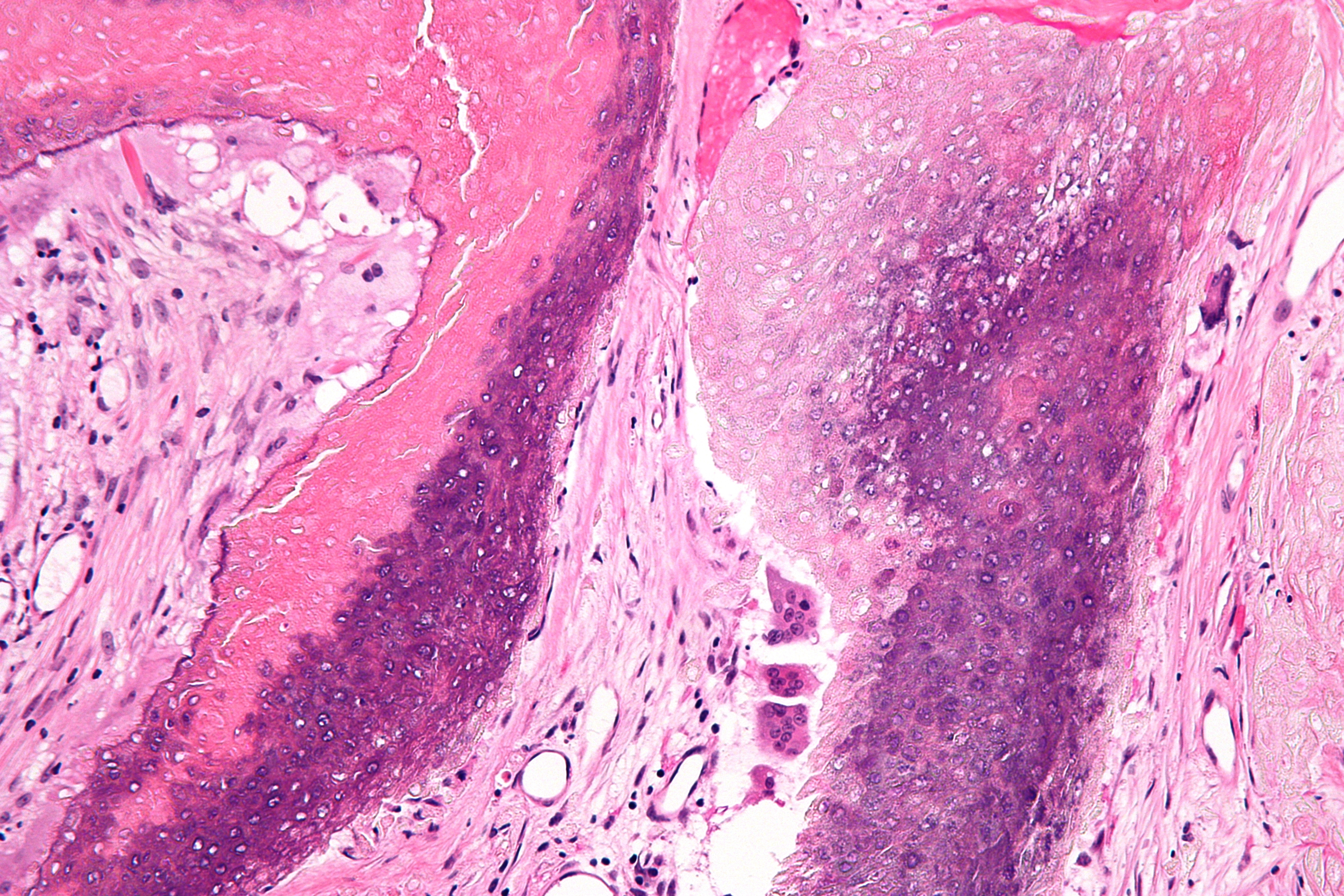
Micrograph of a pilomatricoma showing the characteristic "ghost" cells (anucleate squamous cells), benign viable squamous cells and multi-nucleated giant cells. H&E stain.

The characteristic components of a pilomatricoma include a stroma of fibrovascular connective tissue surrounding irregularly shaped, lobulated islands containing basaloid cells (being darkly stained, round or elongated, with indistinct cell borders and minimal cytoplasm, with nuclei being round to ovoid, deeply basophilic and generally prominent nucleoli), which abruptly or gradually transitions into ghost cells (having abundant, pale, eosinophilic cytoplasm, well defined cell borders and a central clear area, but only faint traces of nuclear material), which in turn may transition into keratinaceous to amorphous necrosis.

The presence of calcifications with foreign-body giant cells is common within the tumors.

== Pathogenesis ==
Pilomatricoma is associated with high levels of beta-catenin caused by either a mutation in the APC gene or a stabilizing mutation in the beta-catenin gene, CTNNB1. A high level of beta-catenin increases cell proliferation, inhibits cell death, and ultimately leads to neoplastic growth.

== See also ==
- Malignant pilomatricoma
- List of cutaneous conditions
- List of cutaneous neoplasms associated with systemic syndromes
