= Malignant pilomatricoma =

- Other names: Pilomatrical carcinoma, and Pilomatrix carcinoma
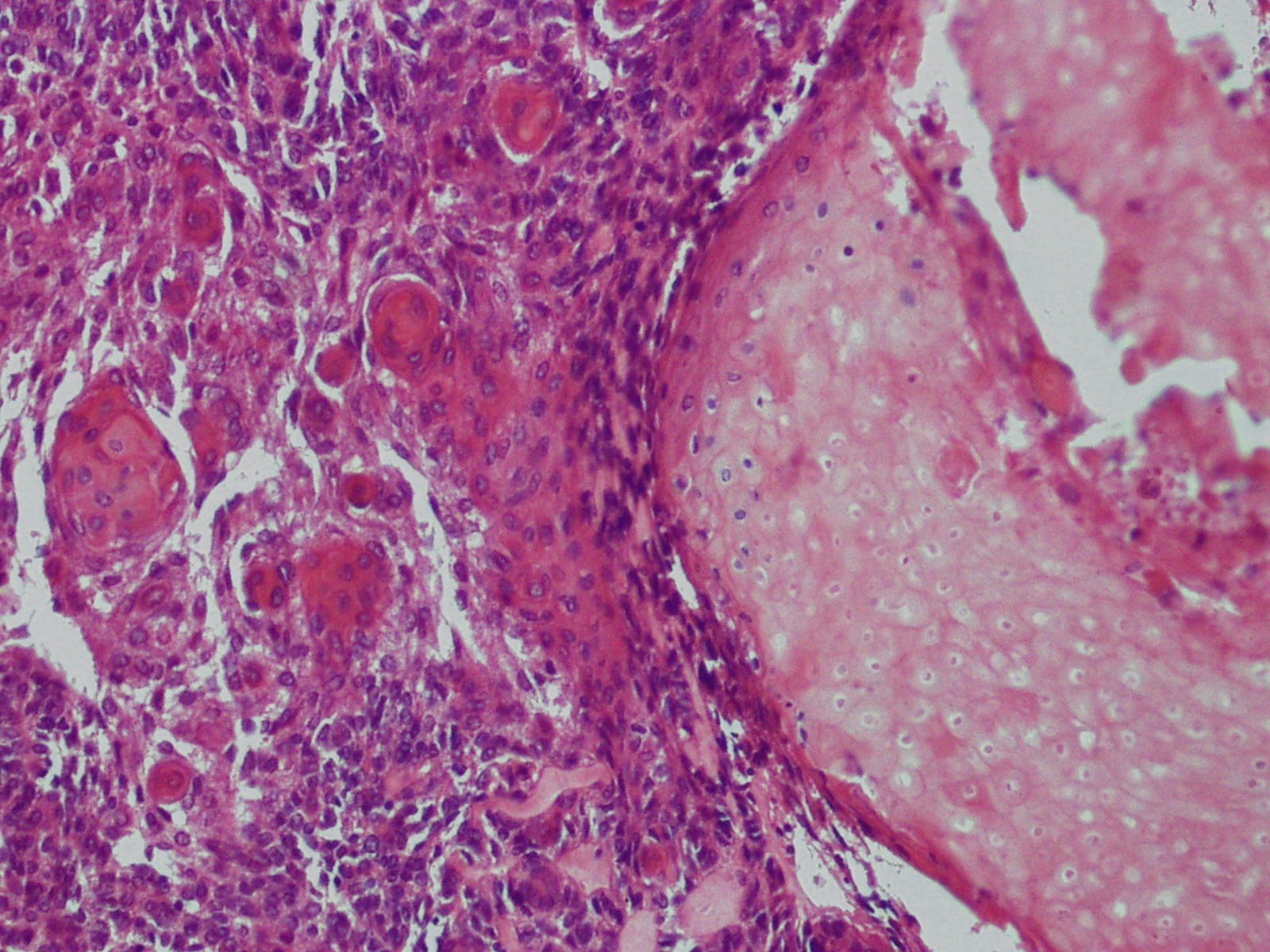
- Specialty: Oncology, dermatology

Malignant pilomatricoma is a cutaneous condition characterized by a locally aggressive tumor composed of hair-matrix cells.

== Signs and symptoms ==
Malignant pilomatricoma usually manifests as a single firm, painless, movable, asymptomatic dermal or subcutaneous lump. It has been shown that the underlying skin can become ulcerated and exhibit severe discoloration; the latter is thought to be one of the few significant indicators of cancer. The head, neck, and back are frequent locations of occurrence. Their sizes range from 1 to 10 cm.

== Diagnosis ==
Grossly, removed tumors frequently have a grayish appearance, are cystoid, encapsulated, and have viscous fluids. Histologically, there is an abrupt shift to eosinophilic ghost or shadow cells (anucleate matrical corneocytes), which are characterized by a prominent proliferation of basaloid cells with ample transparent cytoplasm. Seldom do basaloid cells palisade or contain melanin; instead, they aggregate into nests, bands, and amorphous sheets. There are calcification and ulceration scattered across the cell types. The basaloid cells' nuclei exhibit pleomorphism, frequent aberrant mitoses, and a high apoptotic index. The diagnosis is strongly supported by ulceration and infiltration into adnexal structures; some reports even establish a correlation between these findings and the degree of malignancy. Usually, a lymphohistiocytic infiltration and dense desmoplastic stroma are found next to the tumor capsule.

== Treatment ==
Malignant pilomatricoma is a low grade malignant tumor that is locally aggressive. Therefore, sufficient surgical clearance is necessary to stop localized recurrence.

== Outlook ==
The initial treatment strategy and the diagnosis of the suspicious lesion are the primary factors influencing the overall outcome in malignant pilomatricoma. Lesions that were treated with simple excision resurfaced locally in 50–83 percent of instances, but lesions that were broadly excised returned in 18–23 percent of patients. In 10 to 16 percent of patients, there were metastases, which usually damaged pulmonary or lymphatic organs. Seven to nine percent of patients reported a death related to malignant pilomatricoma, either directly or indirectly.

== Epidemiology ==
As of 2022 about 130 cases have been reported in English literature.

== See also ==
- Pilomatricoma
- List of cutaneous conditions
