= Ghost cell =

Type of cell without a nucleus

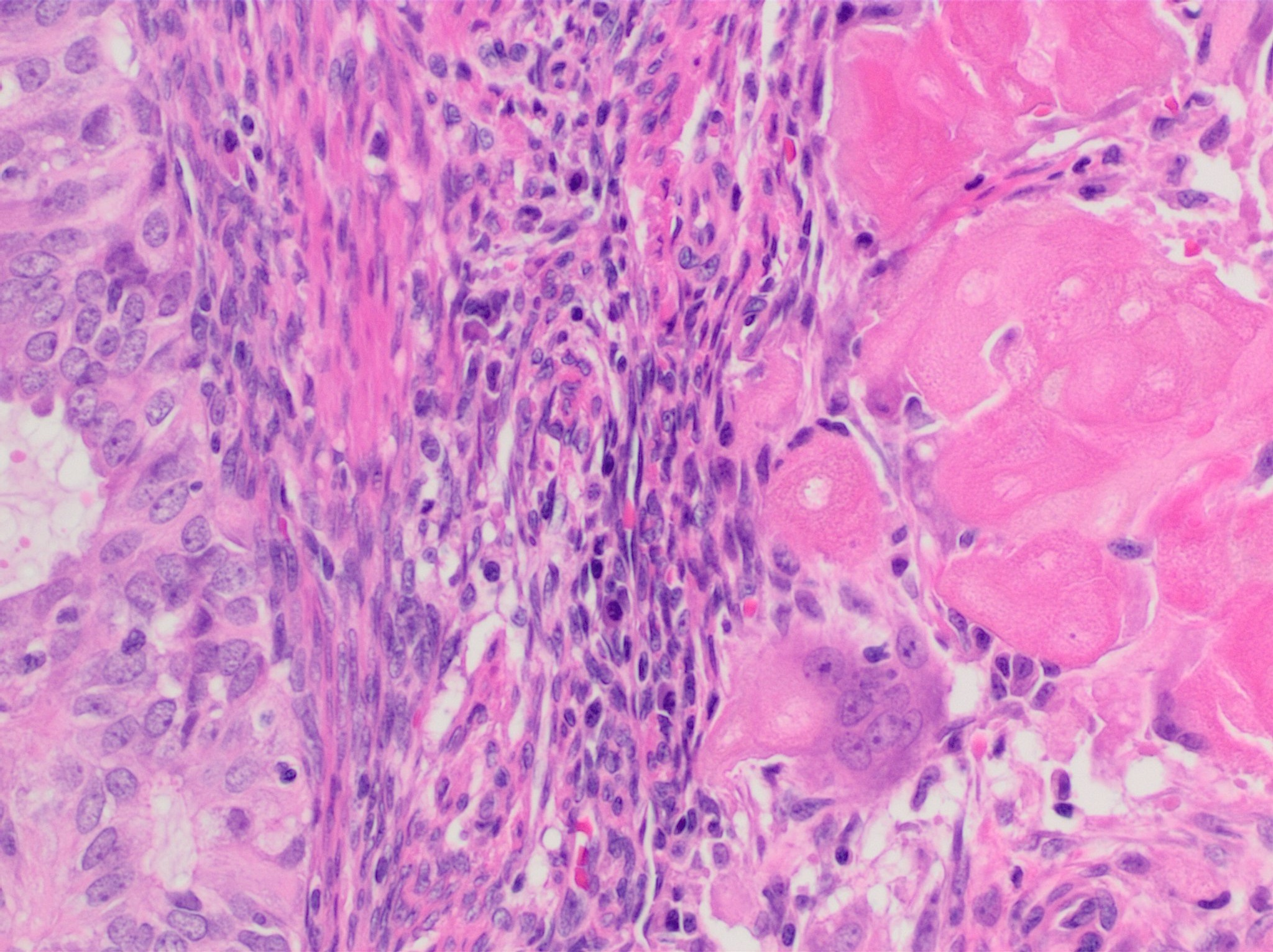
Endometrial adenocarcinoma with necrotic ghost cells of keratinocytes at right in image, leaving pink keratin and clear spaces at the prior locations of the nuclei.

A ghost cell is an enlarged eosinophilic epithelial cell with eosinophilic cytoplasm but without a nucleus. It has lost its nucleus and cytoplasmic contents, leaving behind only the cell membrane and sometimes remnants of the cell's structure. In pathology, ghost cells are often associated with certain types of tumors, such as pilomatricomas and calcifying odontogenic cysts, where they appear as pale, anucleate cells that have undergone degeneration or calcification.

The ghost cells indicate coagulative necrosis where there is cell death but retainment of cellular architecture. In histologic sections ghost cells are those which appear as shadow cells. They are dead cells. For example, in peripheral blood smear preparations, the RBCs are lysed and appear as ghost cells.

They are found in:

- Craniopharyngioma (Rathke pouch)
- Odontoma
- Ameloblastic fibroma
- Calcifying odontogenic cyst (Gorlin cyst)
- Pilomatricoma
