= Periapical periodontitis =

Inflammation at the apex of a tooth root

- Other names: Apical periodontitis, periradicular periodontitis
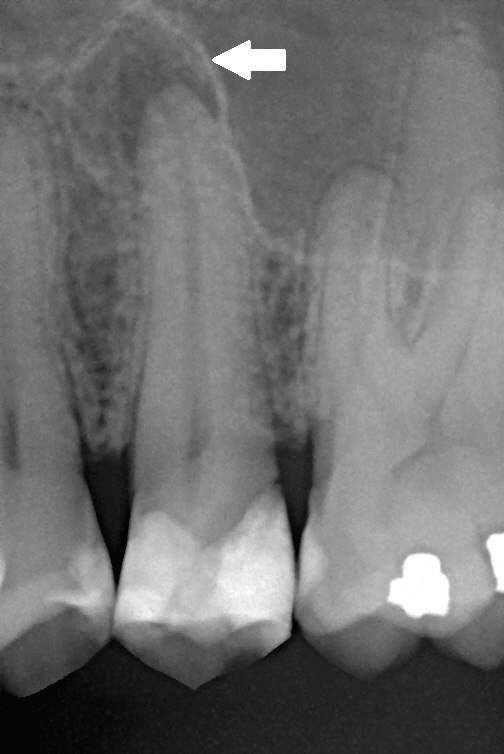
- Periapical dental radiograph showing chronic periapical periodontitis on the root of the left maxillary second premolar. Note large restoration present in the tooth, which will have undergone pulpal necrosis at some point before the development of this lesion.
- Specialty: Endodontics
- Complications: Apical extrusion of pulpal debris, abscesses in the head and neck, Ludwig Angina
- Causes: Pulp infection
- Risk factors: Dental caries, dental trauma, dental procedures, professional misconduct
- Diagnostic method: Apical Radiolucencies, Apical Radiopacities
- Treatment: Root canal treatment, periradicular surgery, retrograde root canal treatment
- Medication: Antibiotic in case of a sudden onset of symptoms in less than 24 hours.

Periapical periodontitis or apical periodontitis (AP) is an acute or chronic inflammatory lesion around the apex of a tooth root, most commonly caused by bacterial invasion of the pulp of the tooth. It is a likely outcome of untreated dental caries (tooth decay), and in such cases it can be considered a sequela in the natural history of tooth decay, irreversible pulpitis and pulpal necrosis. Other causes can include occlusal trauma due to 'high spots' after restoration work, extrusion from the tooth of root filling material, or bacterial invasion and infection from the gums. Periapical periodontitis may develop into a periapical abscess, where a collection of pus forms at the end of the root, the consequence of spread of infection from the tooth pulp (odontogenic infection), or into a periapical cyst, where an epithelial lined, fluid-filled structure forms.

Etymologically, the name refers to inflammation (Latin, -itis) around (peri- ) the root tip or apex (-apical) of the tooth (-odont-). Periradicular periodontitis is an alternative term.

== Diagnosis ==
The radiographic features of periapical inflammatory lesions vary depending on the time course of the lesion. Because very early lesions may not show any radiographic changes, diagnosis of these lesions relies solely on the clinical symptoms. More chronic lesions may show lytic (radiolucent) or sclerotic (radiopaque) changes, or both.

=== Classification ===
Classification of periapical periodontitis is usually based on whether the process is acute/symptomatic or chronic/asymptomatic.

(Note: alternative names for periapical periodontitis include 'apical periodontitis' and 'periradicular periodontitis'.)

==== Acute periapical periodontitis ====
Acute (or symptomatic) periapical periodontitis.... Malaise throbbing pain due to Inflammation within periodontal ligament

==== Chronic periapical periodontitis ====
Chronic (or asymptomatic) periapical periodontitis.

== Related lesions ==
In addition to periapical abscesses, periapical periodontitis can give rise to various related lesions, including periapical granulomas and cysts. A periapical granuloma (also referred to as an 'apical granuloma' or 'radicular granuloma') is a mass of chronically inflamed granulation tissue that forms at the apex of the root of a nonvital (dead) tooth. (Although not a true granuloma, given the absence of granulomatous inflammation, the term 'periapical granuloma' is widely accepted.)

== Treatment ==
Treatment options may include antibiotic therapy (in the short term, augmented by chewing gum), root canal therapy, or extraction.

== Epidemiology ==
Periapical periodontitis of some form is a very common condition. The prevalence of periapical periodontitis is generally reported to vary according to age group, e.g. 33% in those aged 20–30, 40% in 30- to 40-year-olds, 48% in 40- to 50-year-olds, 57% in 50- to 60-year-olds and 62% in those over the age of 60. Most epidemiologic data has been generated in European countries, especially Scandinavia. While millions of root canal treatments are carried out in the United States alone each year, total numbers of such cases do not provide reliable indicators of frequency, even for symptomatic periapical periodontitis (given that root canal treatment is not always indicated or complied with, and may also be performed in the absence of periapacial periodontitis).
