= Calcifying odontogenic cyst =

- Other names: Gorlin cyst, calcifying cystic odontogenic tumor
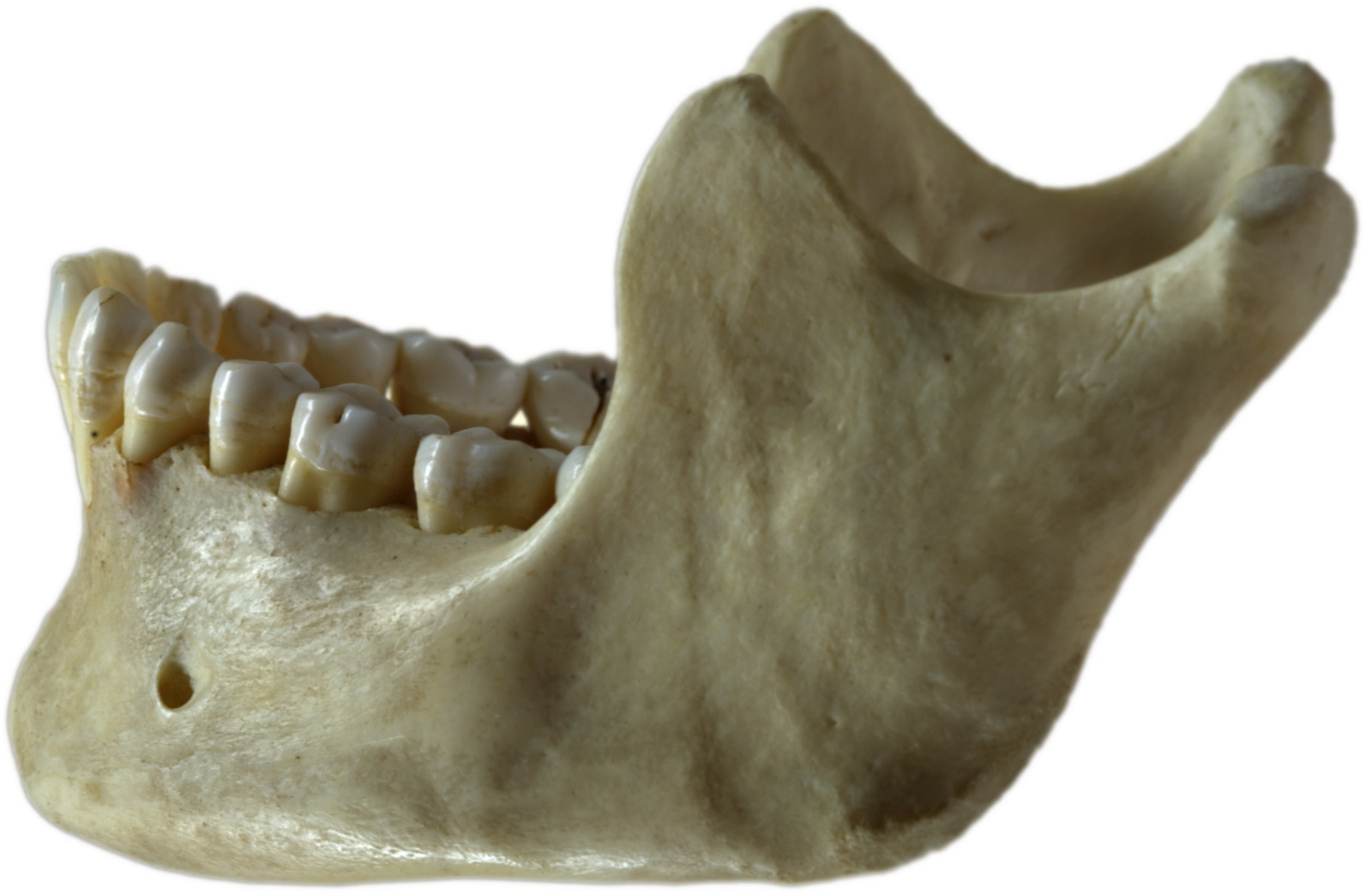
- This condition usually affects the jaw area
- Specialty: Dentistry

Calcifying odontogenic cyst (COC) is a rare developmental lesion that comes from odontogenic epithelium. It is also known as a calcifying cystic odontogenic tumor, which is a proliferation of odontogenic epithelium and scattered nest of ghost cells and calcifications that may form the lining of a cyst, or present as a solid mass.

It can appear in any location in the oral cavity, but more commonly affects the anterior (front) mandible and maxilla. It is most common in individuals in their 20s to 30s, but can be seen at almost any age, regardless of gender. On dental radiographs, the calcifying odontogenic cyst appears as a unilocular (one circle) radiolucency (dark area). In one-third of cases, an impacted tooth is involved. Histologically, cells that are described as "ghost cells", enlarged eosinophilic epithelial cells without nuclei, are present within the epithelial lining and may undergo calcification.

== Signs and symptoms ==
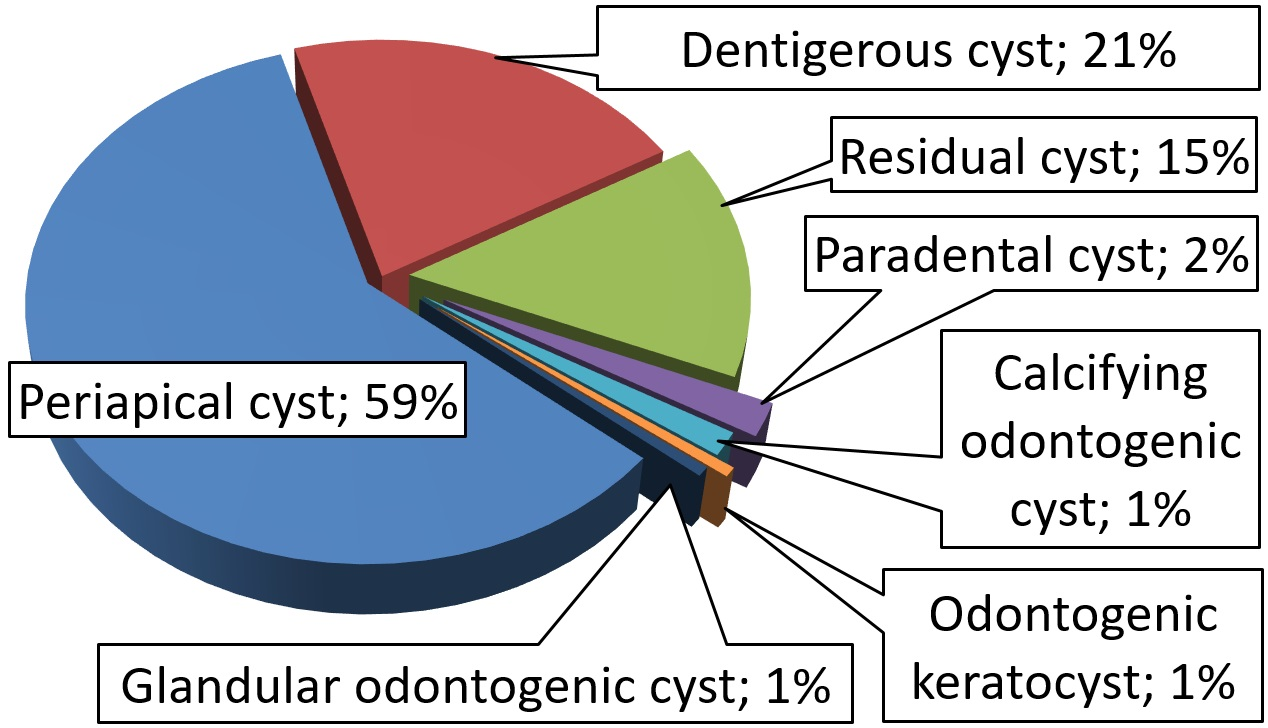
Relative incidence of odontogenic cysts. Calcifying odontogenic cyst is labeled at right.

Most calcifying odontogenic cysts appear asymptomatic. They are normally presented as a painless, slow-growing mass on the mandible and/or the maxilla, mostly in the front of the mouth. Symptoms include swelling in the mouth, both inside the bone, in the tooth bearing areas, and outside the bone, in the gingiva. When a COC is located in the maxilla, individuals might complain of nasal stiffness, epistaxis, and headache.

Impacted or displaced teeth are often found due to COC. The diameter of the cyst ranges from 2 to 4 cm and swelling pain may be present. Intrabony (between bone) expansions may produce hard bony expansion and may perforate cortical bones. It can also extend to soft tissue.

== Causes ==
It is believed that the calcifying odontogenic cyst arose from odontogenic epithelial remnants (remains) that were trapped within the bones of the maxilla and mandible or gingival tissues. It is associated with impacted and unerupted teeth.

== Mechanism/Pathophysiology ==
Calcifying odontogenic cysts are characterized by the presence of a variable number of ghost cells within the epithelial lining. The eosinophilic ghost cells are those that have been changed in a way without a nucleus, but it has been able to maintain its basic cell shape.

The mechanism for the formation of a calcifying odontogenic cyst is controversial, whether the ghost cells change is based on coagulative necrosis (accidental cell death caused by ischemia or infarction)/the build up of enamel protein or it's a form of normal or abnormal keratinization (formation of keratin proteins) of odontogenic epithelium. Large amounts of ghost cells fuse together to form large sheets of material with an undefined shape and are acellular. Calcification of the sheets may occur. It first appears as fine basophilic granules that enlarge and accumulate, forming large masses of calcifying material. Eosinophilic dentinoid (abnormal form of dentin) material is present next to a sheet of ghost cells.

Some forms of the cystic type of COC, the epithelial lining proliferates into the lumen (inside space of the cyst), so it is filled with masses of ghost cells and dystrophic calcifications.

In a different form, unifocal or multifocal epithelial proliferation (increase in numbers) of the cyst lining into the lumen may look similar to ameloblastoma. These proliferations have a mix of different numbers of ghost cells.

Neoplastic or solid COCs are uncommon. They consist of extraosseous (outside bone) and intraosseous (inside bone) forms. The extraosseous form, being the most common of the two, consists of odontogenic epithelium in the fibrous stroma, with columnar cells and stellate reticulum and ghost cells. The intraosseous form consists of ameloblastoma-like strands and epithelium in fibrous connective tissue stroma with ghost cells present.

Rarely, odontogenic ghost cell tumors are malignant (odontogenic ghost cell carcinoma). These are aggressive and invade surrounding tissues through cellular pleomorphism and mitotic activity.

=== Pathogenesis ===
The epithelial lining has the ability to induce the formation of dental tissues in the adjacent connective tissue wall.

== Diagnosis ==
=== Radiographic features ===
These calcifying odontogenic cysts are usually discovered using dental radiographs. They will appear as unilocular (one chamber), multilocular (multiple chambers) or mixed radiolucencies with some radiopaque deposits of differing sizes and opacities. Irregular calcifications may be seen in some cases. They are often located in a periapical or lateral periodontal relationship to adjacent teeth.

=== CT Scan ===
CT scans can also be used to view the internal structures of the lesions and the involvement of neighboring structures. It is helpful in clinical diagnoses and treatment planning. They reveal vital characteristics that are not shown or detected in a dental radiograph. They are used to confirm the presence of calcifications along the cyst wall that were not detected in the radiographic images.

=== Histology ===
In general, the epithelium seen is of stratified squamous type and is 5–8 cells thick. Additionally, focal areas of stellate reticulum like cells are seen and near the basement membrane ameloblast-like cells may be seen. Each type of calcifying odontogenic cyst shows special features of which there are three types:

1)Type 1A. Ghost cells and dentinoid are seen.

2)Type 1B. Formation of calcified tissues in the lumen of the cyst wall showing dystrophic calcification. Proliferation of tissues is similar to an Ameloblastic Fibroma.

3)Type 1C. Ameloblast-like proliferation in the connective tissue and lumen of the cyst may be seen.

== Treatment ==
The standard treatment of calcifying odontogenic cyst is enucleation and curettage, however it depends on the lesion site and histological pattern. Enucleation followed by the removal of 1 to 2 millimeters layer of bone around the edges of the cystic cavity with a sharp curette or bone bur. The point of this procedure is to remove the epithelial debris that could cause recurrent lesions. Recurrence following enucleation and curretage is rare.

Once treatment is complete, follow-up visits may be required to monitor recurrence of the cyst.

== Prognosis ==
The prognosis of a calcifying odontogenic cyst is favorable. It has minimal chance of recurrence after simple surgical removal. There have only been a small number of recurrences reported after enucleation.

== Epidemiology ==
About 65% of cases are found in the front of the mouth in the incisor and canine areas. It may occur in individuals aged between infancy to elderly, but the average is 33 years. However, it most commonly occurs in individuals in their twenties to thirties. There is no correlation to gender and race because it can occur in any individual.

== Research Directions ==
A calcifying odontogenic cyst is a very uncommon lesion. One researcher stated that he reviewed the COC for 3 year and has only found 51 cases diagnosed as COC. The average number of cases that an oral and maxillofacial surgeon would only see about 1 to 2 cases in their career.

In a case study that was conducted in 2011, a 23-year-old female came with in swelling in the upper right side of the jaw that had been present for about 2 years. Upon examination, there was asymmetry of the face that involved the right midface area. A hard bony expansion could be felt when touching the right maxilla. The radiographic examination showed unilocular, well-circumscribed, round radiolucency in the front, right maxilla extending above the canine to the central incisor (front tooth). Based on clinical and radiographic findings, the diagnosis was considered to be a calcifying odontogenic cyst or calcifying odontogenic tumor. It was treated with an enucleation of the cyst which was 4 to 5 mm in diameters. The specimen was sent for a biopsy and it was revealed that the cyst was indeed a calcifying odontogenic cyst. The purpose of this article was to demonstrate the importance of radiographic and clinical examination for the diagnosis of the COC so proper treatment may be performed as well as histopathological evaluation for confirmation of the diagnosis.

In a 2018 case study, a total of 6,250 oral and maxillofacial lesions were diagnosed during a 26-year study period. Of those 6,250 cases, only 20 cases, or 0.3%, were confirmed diagnoses of COC. Most were found in the mandible and the age ranged from 9 to 58 years. 90% reported no painful symptoms, however, 10% did. In this study, there was a higher prevalence of COC in the posterior mandible, which is about 55% of the cases. This study was compared to other studies, which found the prevalence of COC occurring mostly in the maxilla and the anterior region. The location of the lesion is important for diagnosis because many other bone diseases can be commonly found in the posterior mandible.

== See also ==
- Cyst
- Odontogenic cyst
