= Nasopharyngeal cyst =

Cystic swelling arising from midline and lateral wall of the nasopharynx

Nasopharyngeal cyst refers to cystic swelling arising from midline and lateral wall of the nasopharynx. The commonest cyst arising from lateral wall is the nasopharyngeal branchial cyst, whereas the mucus retention cysts are the commonest to arise from the midline. Sometimes nasopharyngeal cyst may directly refer to Tornwaldt cyst. It arises from the midline and lies deep to the pharyngobasilar fascia which helps to distinguish it from a mucous retention cyst. The main difference lies in that nasopharyngeal branchial cyst is congenital whereas the Tornwaldt's cyst is acquired.

== Nasopharyngeal Branchial Cyst ==
These are congenital cysts often arising from the fossa of Rosenmüller located in the lateral wall of the nasopharynx. They represent remnants of first branchial cleft. These may extend superiorly to reach the bony confines of eustachian tube even to the skull base.

Initially patients are asymptomatic but may present with aural fullness, unilateral conductive hearing loss, and serous otitis media as the cyst mass grows. In even more rare cases, they may be the source for unexplained sinonasal symptoms, such as CSF rhinorrhea, visual disturbances and nasal obstruction.

== Diagnosis ==
In most of the cases incidental diagnosis happens while performing nasal endoscopy. MRI and CT scan can be helpful for further confirmation of diagnosis.

On CT scan a low density, well capsulated mass in the roof of nasopharynx is suggestive of Thornwaldt cyst.

== Differential Diagnosis ==
Differential diagnosis of this cyst are branchial cleft cyst, Rathke cleft cyst, neurenteric cyst, nasopharyngeal carcinoma, adenoid retention cyst, meningocele and meningomyelocele.

== Treatment ==
Surgery is performed once symptomatic using transplatatine or endonasal route with the help of nasal endoscopy.
