= Periapical granuloma =

Inflammation at the tip of a dead tooth

Periapical granuloma, also sometimes referred to as a radicular granuloma or apical granuloma, is an inflammation at the tip of a dead (nonvital) tooth. It is a lesion or mass that typically starts out as an epithelial lined cyst, and undergoes an inward curvature that results in inflammation of granulation tissue at the root tips of a dead tooth. This is usually due to dental caries or a bacterial infection of the dental pulp. Periapical granuloma is an infrequent disorder that has an occurrence rate between 9.3 and 87.1 percent. Periapical granuloma is not a true granuloma due to the fact that it does not contain granulomatous inflammation; however, periapical granuloma is a common term used.

== Symptoms ==
Patients who have a periapical granuloma are usually asymptomatic; however, when there is inflammation, patients could experience temperature sensitivity, pain while chewing solid foods, swelling and sensitivity to a dental percussion test.

Generally, periapical granuloma is diagnosed due to acute pain in a tooth, or during a radiographic examination in routine visits to the dentist.

== Radiographic features ==
When looking at the radiographic features of periapical granuloma, typically there is a radiolucent lesion visible at the tip of a root on a nonvital tooth. This often is associated with root resorption. The radiolucency must correlate with the lateral root surface or the root of the tooth.

The average size of radiography when looking at periapical granuloma is 7.4 millimeters (mm).

== Histopathology ==
When examining the tissues of periapical granuloma for disease, hyperaemia, oedema and chronic inflammation is observed in the periodontal ligament. The vascular amplification and inflammation is adjacent to the bone, and bone absorption occurs next to a large growth in fibroblast and endothelial cells which is composed of the small fibers (fibrils) with small vascular conduits (channels of passage for fluids).

The lesion is predominantly composed of plasma cells that are mixed with macrophages and lymphocytes with endothelial cells and fibroblasts.

== Treatment ==
Treatment for periapical granuloma is initially treated with a nonsurgical procedure. Endodontic treatments of teeth with periapical lesions (lesions that occurred as a result of dental pulp inflammation) have a success rate up to 85 percent. Other forms of nonsurgical treatments used for periapical lesions are: a root canal, an aspiration-irrigation technique (a technique to help minimize the force required for the removal of root canal irrigant); a decompression technique (a minimally invasive surgery that involves the placement of tubing to help maintain drainage); Lesion Sterilization and Repair Therapy (a technique that allows disinfection of pulpal (dental pulp), dentinal (dentin) and periradicular (around a root) lesions by using a combination of antibacterial drugs; a method using calcium hydroxide and the Apexum procedure (a minimally invasive removal, through a root canal access, of periapical chronically inflamed tissue). It is essential to monitor the healing closely after treatment with frequent follow-up examinations. If nonsurgical techniques fail, surgical intervention is then recommended.

There are many things to be considered prior to surgical treatment in order to decide which technique will have the best outcome. When determining an approach for surgical approaches, clinicians must establish the correct diagnosis of the lesion to make sure there isn’t treatment being done on healthy (vital) teeth. It is also important to take into consideration the distance (proximity) of the lesion to the vital teeth. If the lesion is in close proximity to the roots of vital teeth, a surgical approach may have negative outcomes that include the blood vessels and nerves of the adjacent teeth being injured, this of which would jeopardize their vitality (life). Surgical approaches increase the risk of the anatomic structures being damaged. Some of these anatomic structures include: the nasal cavity, mental foramen, the inferior alveolar nerve and / or the inferior alveolar artery and the maxillary sinus. When sinus cavities or adjacent tissue spaces are involved, the nonsurgical aspiration-irrigation technique is also not advised. The patient’s cooperation and age of the patient are very important as well. Patients may experience pain or discomfort during or after treatment when taking the surgical approach which could make them uncooperative. Patients that are older may not be able to tolerate this pain or discomfort, therefore they may require nonsurgical approaches. If access to the apical foramen is prevented due to blockages in the root canal system, a surgical approach may be warranted. Finally, surgery is recommended in cases where patients have the presence of cholesterol crystals or inflammatory apical true cysts (the top of an enclosed space lined by the epithelium and usually contains fluid) due to the fact that these can prevent the healing of the lesions.

== See also ==
- Periapical periodontitis
