= Pericardial cyst =

Uncommon benign dilatation of the pericardial sac surrounding the heart

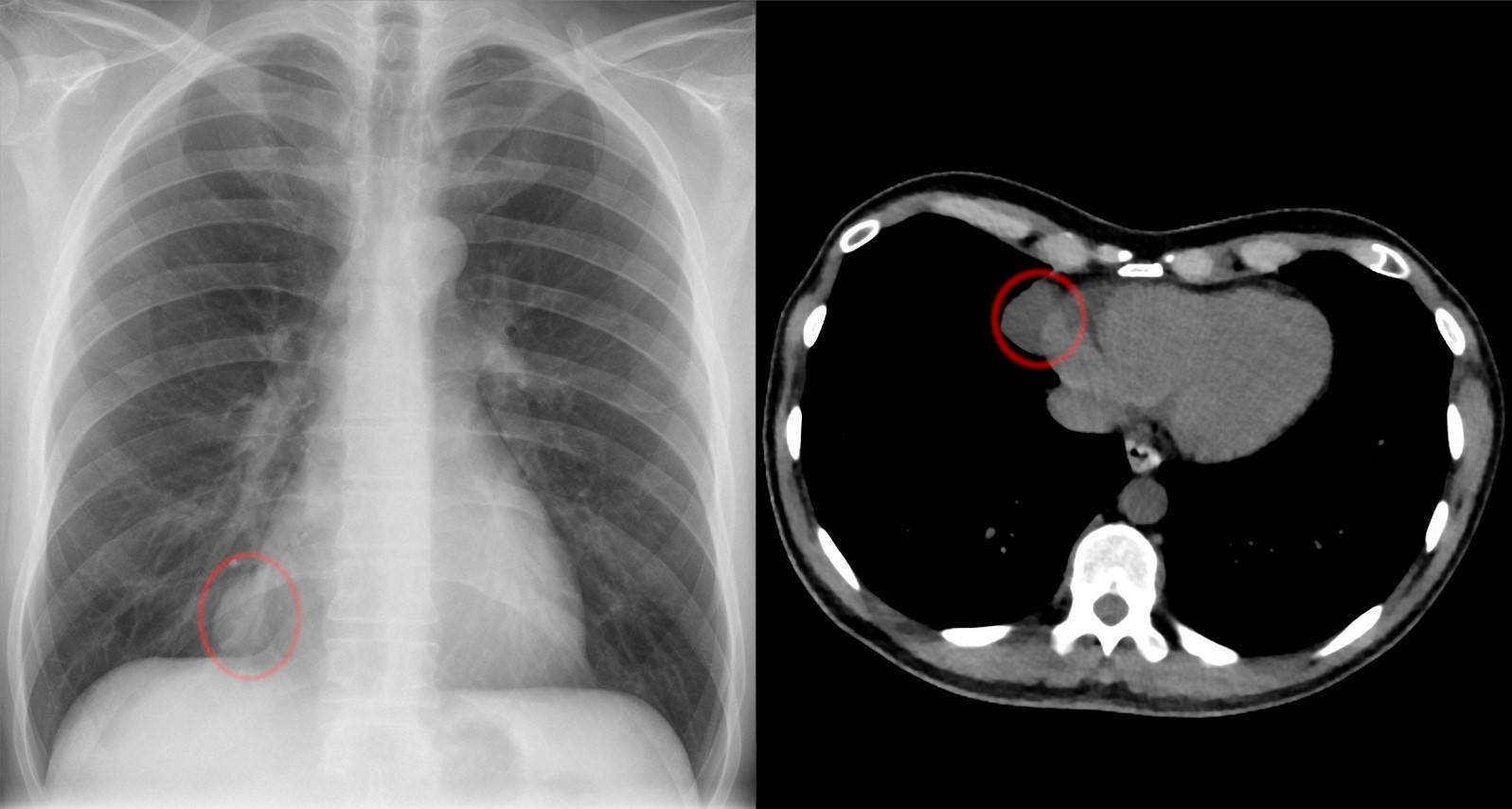
Small pericardial cyst circled on chest x-ray (left) and chest CT scan (right)

A pericardial cyst is an uncommon benign dilatation of the pericardial sac surrounding the heart. It can lead to symptoms by compressing nearby structures, but is usually asymptomatic. Pericardial cysts can be congenital or acquired, and they are typically diagnosed with radiologic imaging. Management of pericardial cysts can include follow-up imaging, percutaneous aspiration, or surgical resection.

== Presentation ==
Pericardial cysts most often are asymptomatic, with 50 to 75% of patients experiencing no symptoms. The presentation of symptomatic cysts depends on the cyst location and effects on nearby structures, including the heart, lungs, and esophagus. Symptoms can include chest pain, cough, shortness of breath, palpitations, syncope, recurrent pneumonia, congestive heart failure, difficulty swallowing, and weight loss.

== Causes ==
Pericardial cysts can be congenital or acquired, with the majority being congenital. Congenital pericardial cysts happen due to an abnormality in the development of the pericardial sac that creates a bulge which is walled off to form a cyst. Acquired pericardial cysts can be caused by inflammation from surgery, pericarditis, trauma, echinococcosis, tuberculosis, metastasis, or hemodialysis. The inflammation can lead to a walled-off pocket of fluid that is a pericardial cyst.

== Diagnosis ==
Since pericardial cysts are often asymptomatic, the most common diagnosis is through incidental finding on a chest x-ray. Differentiation of pericardial cysts from diverticula is usually impossible as both the lesions have similar radiological appearance. The lone differentiating feature is the presence of communicating tract between pericardium and the cyst cavity in the diverticula, unlike the fully walled off pericardial cyst. When patients have symptoms, transthoracic echocardiogram is one of the first tests used to look for a pericardial cyst. CT or MRI may also be used to diagnose pericardial cysts. On CT and MRI a pericardial cyst will commonly appear as a round, fluid-filled structure surrounded by thin walls. Diagnosis of a pericardial cyst can also be made before birth using ultrasound.

The differential diagnosis for a suspected pericardial cyst includes a bronchial cyst, pericardial effusion, teratoma, lymphangioma, pericardial fat, congenital diaphragmatic hernia, neuroenteric cyst, and congenital cyst from the primitive foregut.

== Management ==
Pericardial cysts that are small and cause no symptoms can be followed with repeat imaging through echocardiogram, CT, or MRI to assess for changes. Pericardial cysts that are large or cause symptoms may be candidates for percutaneous aspiration, ethanol sclerosis, or surgery. Percutaneous aspiration removes the fluid from inside the cyst, and ethanol sclerosis uses the injection of ethanol into the cyst after aspiration to decrease the likelihood of cyst recurrence. Percutaneous aspiration with ethanol sclerosis is typically the first treatment for pericardial cyst that requires management. Surgery can remove a pericardial cyst through a thoracotomy, sternotomy, mediastinoscopy, or video-assisted thoracic surgery. The type of surgery is chosen based on the size and location of the pericardial cyst.

== Prognosis ==
With most pericardial cysts having no symptoms, the prognosis is very good. The cysts can resolve without intervention. If percutaneous aspiration is performed, the recurrence rate of pericardial cysts is about 30-33%. Although pericardial cysts are benign, the location of cysts can rarely cause life-threatening emergencies by compressing the heart or lungs.

== Epidemiology ==
Pericardial cysts have an incidence of 1 in 100,000. Pericardial cysts make up 6-7% of all mediastinal masses. They can present at any age, but are most commonly diagnosed between the third and fifth decade of life. Females and males have approximately equal incidences of pericardial cysts.

== History ==
Pericardial cysts were first reported on during autopsies in the 19th century by pathologists. As the field of radiology progressed, pericardial cysts could be identified in living patients. In 1931, the first surgical resection of a pericardial cyst was performed by Otto Pickhardt at Lenox Hill Hospital in New York using a thoracoscopy. In 1943, Greenfield and his colleagues coined the term "spring water cysts" for pericardial cysts since the cysts contain clear fluid.
