= Nasolabial cyst =

- Specialty: Gastroenterology
- Diagnostic method: nasal scope, MRI
- Treatment: surgery

This nasolabial cyst, also known as a nasoalveolar cyst, is located superficially in the soft tissues of the upper lip. Unlike most of the other developmental cysts, the nasolabial cyst is an example of an extraosseous cyst, one that occurs outside of bone. It will therefore not show up on a radiograph, or an X-ray film.
