= Buccal bifurcation cyst =

- Specialty: Dentistry

Buccal bifurcation cyst is an inflammatory odontogenic cyst, of the paradental cysts family, that typically appears in the buccal bifurcation region of the mandibular first molars in the second half of the first decade of life. Infected cysts may be associated with pain. Around 5% of all odontogenic cysts are mandibular buccal bifurcation cysts (MBBC), an unusual inflammatory odontogenic cyst. Stoneman and Worth initially characterised MBBC, and named MBBC as mandibular infected buccal cyst. On occasion, MBBC has been referred to as a paradental cyst (PC). However, according to the World Health Organization, MBBC should be used for cysts related to mandibular first or second molars, while PC should be saved for cysts related to mandibular third molars. The phrase "inflammatory collateral cysts" encompasses both PC and MBBC. Buccal Bifurcation Cyst (BBC) affects the vestibular aspect of roots of the mandibular first molar. The causes of BBC remains unsure and various explanations have been suggested. One of the theories proposed is that the tilting of molar as it erupts creates a deep periodontal pocket in the area of the perforated epithelium. This causes an inflammatory response in the underlying connective tissue, which may stimulate proliferation of epithelial rests leading to cyst formation.

== Epidemiology ==
In regard to the epidemiology of Buccal Bifurcation Cyst, the prevalence of Buccal Bifurcation Cyst has been roughly measured in fewer than 1% of all odontogenic cysts. To the best of our knowledge, no maxillary BBC instances have been documented in the English literature, indicating how rare maxillary occurrence is. Ruddocks et al. conducted an analysis around 2022 and found that 32 studies published since 1970 reported 82 BBCs, all of which were found in the mandible. A rare inflammatory odontogenic cyst that typically affects children in their first ten years of life is called a buccal bifurcation cyst (BBC). Most situations are unilateral, however up to 30% of all BBCs may be bilateral, which can be confusing for new practitioners.

== Etiology ==
The exact etiology of BBC is still unclear, but several theories have been suggested regarding its formation.

One hypothesis suggests that inflammation arises when the tooth penetrates through the oral mucosa during eruption, leading to the proliferation of epithelial cells and cyst formation. Another theory proposes that a tilted mesiobuccal cusp and deep periodontal pockets might lead to inflammation.

Additionally, enamel projections from the cemento-enamel junction, in the cervical region of tooth, extending into the furcation, along with reduced enamel epithelium, may make teeth more prone to buccal pocket formation, which can subsequently expand due to pericoronitis and ultimately lead to cyst formation.

== Pathophysiology ==
A buccal bifurcation cyst (BBC) is a rare type of cyst that originates from the tissues involved in tooth development (odontogenic cyst). It typically forms on the buccal aspect (cheek side) of mandibular molars, particularly affecting children between the ages of 5 and 13. This condition is unique because it is linked to the eruption of molars, but the exact process behind its development is still not completely understood.

The exact cause of BBC remains unclear, but there are a few possible explanations. One theory suggests that chronic inflammation during the eruption of molars could be a significant factor. Since the developing molar is positioned close to the buccal gingiva, food and bacteria can easily get trapped in the gum tissue around the tooth, leading to inflammation. This constant irritation could cause the epithelial rests, which are cells that stay behind after tooth formation (like the rests of Malassez), to form a cyst.

Other contributing factors could include mechanical trauma from the erupting tooth or environmental irritants that. Since these cysts often develop when children’s molars are coming in, it’s thought that they might form in response to occlusal (biting) forces or the pressure exerted during eruption.

When examined under a microscope, BBCs are lined by non-keratinized stratified squamous epithelium, similar to other types of cysts caused by inflammation. This lining can be thin but might show areas of hyperplasia (thickening) in response to irritation. The tissue around the cyst is often inflamed, filled with immune cells like lymphocytes, plasma cells, and neutrophils, which indicates the body’s reaction to the inflammation. You may also see foamy macrophages inside the cyst, which are typical in long-lasting inflammatory conditions.

Inflammation plays a huge role in how BBCs form. When the molar is erupting and inflammation starts, different immune signals, called cytokines (like IL-1 and IL-6) and tumor necrosis factor-alpha (TNF-α), are released. These signals attract immune cells to the area, which break down the bone near the cyst through osteoclastic activity (bone resorption). This leads to the characteristic bone destruction, particularly in the buccal cortical plate of the mandible. Despite this, the roots of the affected tooth are usually not damaged, which helps differentiate BBCs from other types of cysts.

Once a BBC forms, it grows due to hydrostatic pressure within the cyst. The epithelium lining the cyst produces fluid, causing the cyst to expand and further resorb the surrounding bone. Fortunately, BBCs tend to grow slowly and usually do not cause severe symptoms, aside from noticeable buccal swelling. Because of this, these cysts are typically not aggressive and don’t destroy the surrounding tissues.

In conclusion, the development of buccal bifurcation cysts is closely related to inflammation during molar eruption, with epithelial proliferation leading to cyst formation. The cyst grows through a combination of inflammatory and developmental processes. Although we don’t fully understand the pathogenesis of BBC, it involves a mixture of inflammation, mechanical forces, and environmental factors. The prognosis is excellent with proper treatment, as BBCs are generally non-aggressive and respond well to surgery.

== Clinical features ==
Buccal bifurcation cysts (BBC) occur in children between the ages of 4 and 14 years, and they usually appear during the first decade of life as a pediatric lesion. Clinically, deep periodontal pockets are observed on the buccal aspect of the affected tooth, accompanied by buccal expansion. Most BBC affects the vital first or second permanent mandibular molars (buccal aspect), which are occasionally present bilaterally. The symptoms typically emerge around the time of the molar erupts, with the patient experiencing mild tenderness and discomfort on the buccal side of the tooth. Swelling is commonly observed, and the patient often reports a foul-tasting discharge. BBC is often asymptomatic; however, infection with pus drainage and pain can also be present.

== Radiographic features ==
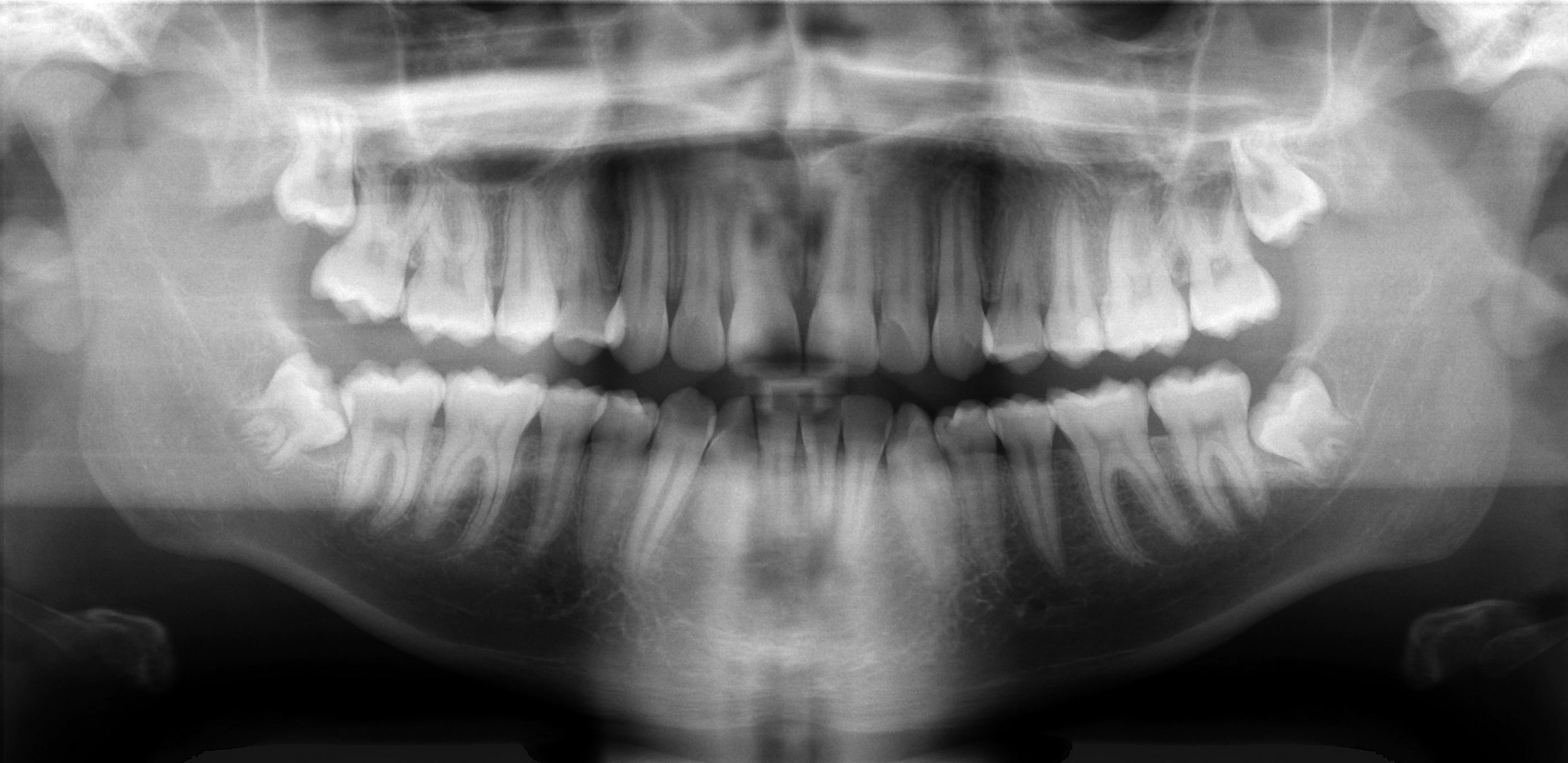
Panoramic radiograph(figure 1) Periapical radiograph(figure 2)

Panoramic(figure 1) and apical(figure 2) radiographs are commonly utilised in routine examinations to aid in the initial detection of BBC. BBC is characterised by a well-defined radiolucent lesion on the buccal aspect of the tooth extending from furcation to the root apices. With the presence of periosteal reaction on the buccal aspect of the tooth. Tilting of the affected molars, with the apices of the roots tilted lingually and cusp tip buccally. Unlike a periapical cyst, the periodontal ligament space and lamina dura remain intact and continuous, suggesting that the lesion is not directly associated with the root apices.

== Investigations and diagnosis ==
As for the investigations, clinical and radiographic examinations are typically done. Clinically, the cyst often presents in children or teenagers with swelling on the buccal aspect of the mandibular molars, along with mild pain or infection. The several radiographic imaging techniques that can be used include panoramic X-rays, periapical radiographs, and cone beam computed tomography.

Panoramic and periapical X-rays are usually performed first to identify the radiolucency on the buccal aspect of the tooth of interest, without involving the apex of the tooth. The roots of the impacted tooth are usually bound by a well-defined radiolucent lesion.

On the other hand, CBCT contributes a more state-of-the-art, three-dimensional image, giving comprehensive characteristic features of the cyst’s location relative to other surrounding structures, buccal expansion, and any associated bone loss, especially furcation involvement. This is exceptionally beneficial for pre-surgical planning and for distinguishing BBC from other alike lesions. Notable surgical findings include the presence of bone cavitation and cystic content, which further aid in the diagnosis. A biopsy or aspiration may also be done to differentiate BBC from other cysts; BBC's lesion aspiration will show a yellowish-white liquid.

As for the differential diagnosis of a buccal bifurcation cyst (BBC), it typically comprises various odontogenic and non-odontogenic lesions. One crucial differential is the periapical cyst, which, like BBC, appears as a radiolucency but is usually linked to a non-vital tooth and found at the apex, not on the buccal side. Besides that, dentigerous cysts, forming around the crowns of unerupted teeth involving erupted molars are also another differential. Both dentigerous cysts and buccal bifurcation cysts (BBC) share the common feature of being associated with a tooth crown. Dentigerous cysts are more frequently found in the mandibular third molars of adults and are classified as developmental cysts that form around the crown of an unerupted tooth. In contrast, BBCs are inflammatory cysts that develop on the buccal side of a vital tooth. Radiographically, a dentigerous cyst appears as a radiolucent area surrounding the crown of an unerupted tooth, whereas a BBC is located on the buccal aspect of the crown of a partially erupted tooth.

Other possibilities include keratocystic odontogenic tumours (KCOT), which may look similar but are more aggressive and frequently occur in other jaw areas. Lateral periodontal cysts and odontogenic myxomas can also imitate BBC radiographically, but variability in position and tooth involvement assist in distinguishing them. A lateral radicular cyst is an inflammatory lesion that shares histological characteristics with other inflammatory cysts, including mandibular buccal bifurcation cysts (MBBC). However, it is specifically associated with a non-vital tooth, and a pulp vitality test can help rule out this possibility.

A proper diagnosis requires a holistic amalgamation of clinical examination, imaging, and sometimes histopathological analysis.

== Treatment and management ==
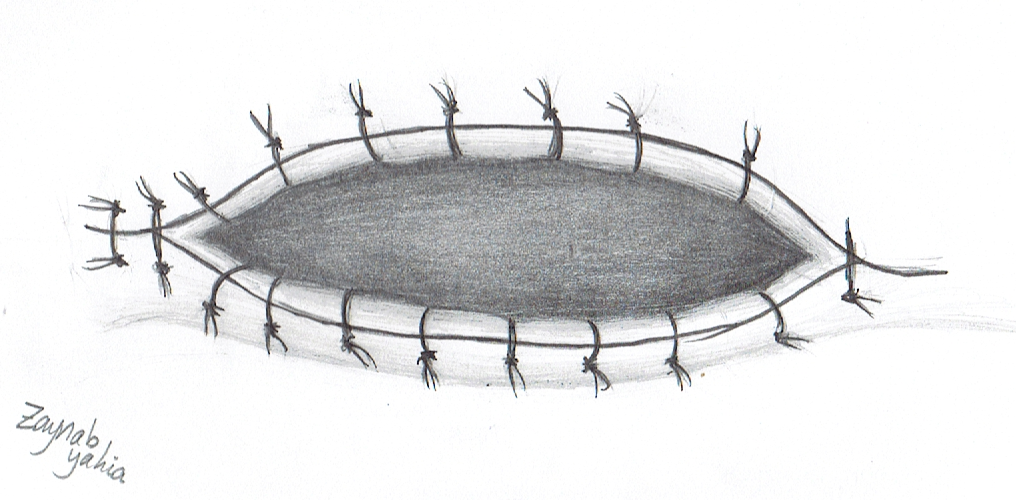
Marsupialization(figure 3)

Although the treatment of the cyst was previously enucleation of the cyst with removal of the involved tooth or enucleation with root-canal treatment, the current management is enucleation with the preservation of the involved tooth. However, recent evidence suggests self-resolution of this type of cyst, thus close observation with meticulous oral hygiene measures can be employed unless the cyst is infected and symptomatic.

Although uncommon, a BBC is a distinct condition that should be carefully considered as a differential diagnosis for a cystic lesion affecting a vital first or second mandibular molar in children and adolescents. Over time, the treatment of BBC has evolved. It was stated that curettage of the cyst and tooth extraction were successful treatments. The permanent dentition may be significantly impacted by the removal of the mandibular molar, hence a more conservative strategy that avoids tooth extraction was later adopted. The marsupialization(figure 3) procedure has been successful in situations where enucleation could jeopardize the health of nearby teeth or cause harm to other nearby tissues such as nasal cavities, paranasal sinuses, and neurovascular bundles. It is recommended that the surgical exposure be large enough to provide proper clinical assessment of the cystic lining because marsupialization by design implies that a sizable amount of the cystic lesion will be retained by the jaws.

The results of cyst enucleation without concurrent extraction are favorable for children between the ages of 5.5 and 11. Following cyst enucleation and curettage, bone grafting was also carried out in three cases either as a primary or secondary adjunct to support the treatment approach. A more conservative strategy without surgery has been proposed by certain authors. Another non-surgical strategy was proposed, which included either no treatment or saline irrigation of the periodontal pocket every day. Pelka et al. successfully managed BBC using a minimally invasive approach that combined surgical pocket drainage with a 10% doxycycline hydrochloride gel, leading to rapid symptom relief. Only routine cleaning was needed thereafter, and the cyst fully resolved within two years. These non-invasive treatments may be particularly beneficial for children with dental anxiety, poor compliance, or medical conditions that necessitate avoiding surgery. Regular follow-up is also recommended to promote proper healing, maintain tooth vitality, and monitor the contralateral tooth for potential cyst development.
