= Myxoid cyst =

- Other names: Digital mucous cyst, and mucous cyst)
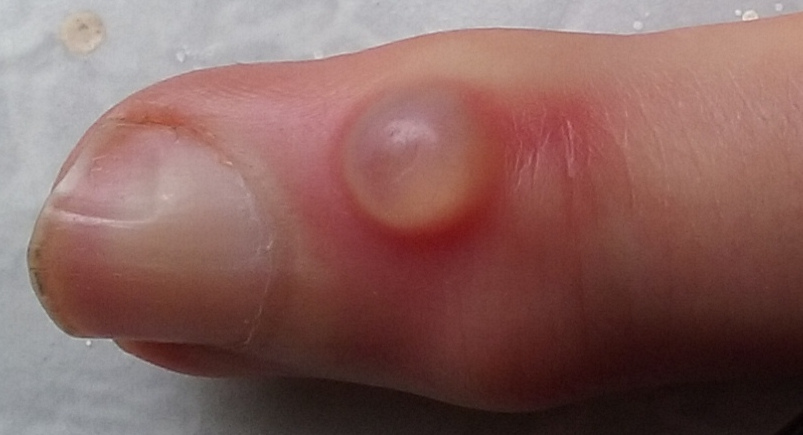
- Digital mucous cyst in left index finger with nail depression
- Specialty: Oncology, rheumatology, orthopedic surgery

A myxoid cyst is a cutaneous condition often characterized by nail plate depression and grooves.

== See also ==
- List of cutaneous conditions
- List of radiographic findings associated with cutaneous conditions
- Scleroderma
