= Cyst =

Closed sac growth on the body

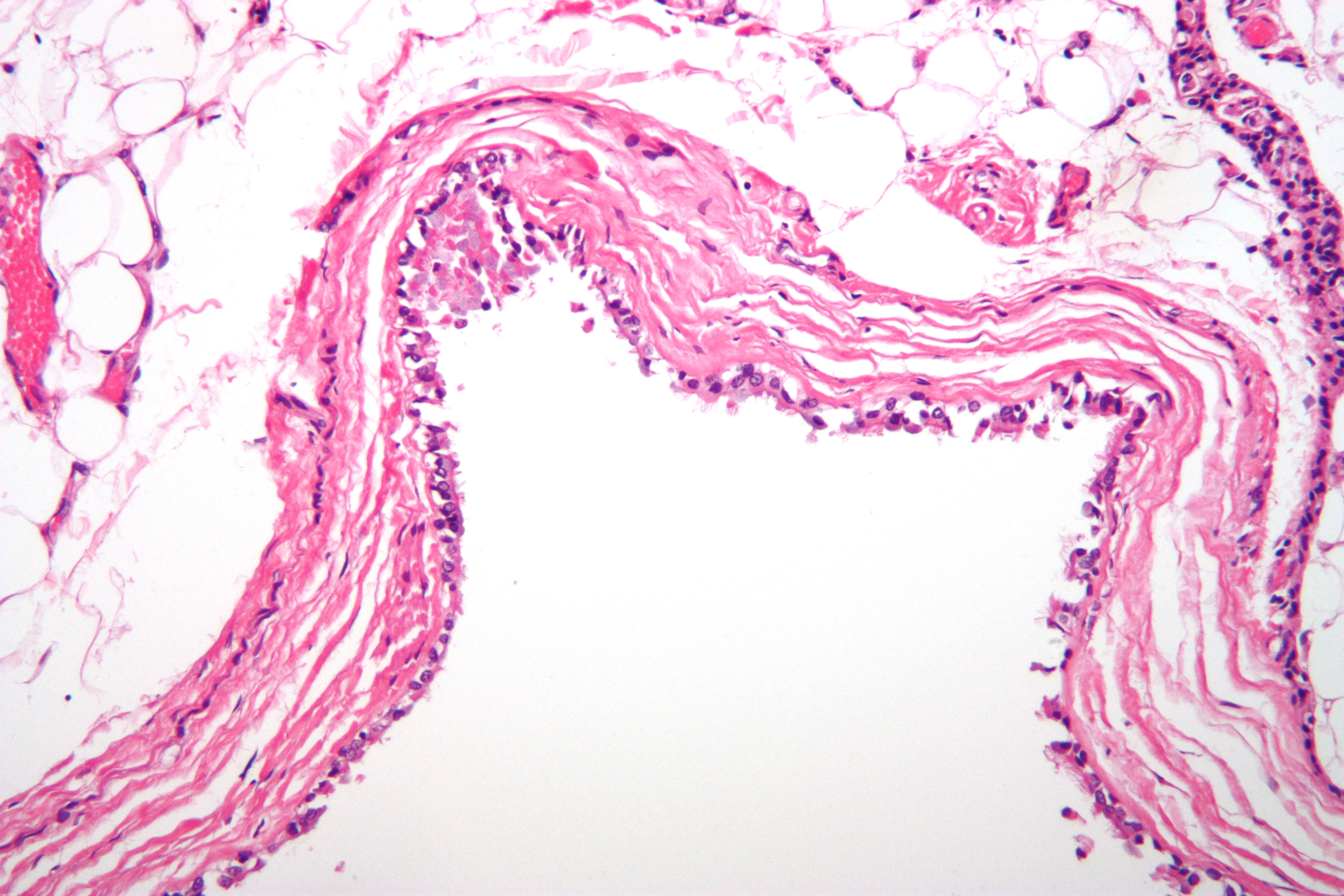
- H&E stained micrograph of a mediastinal bronchogenic cyst
- Specialty: Pathology, general surgery

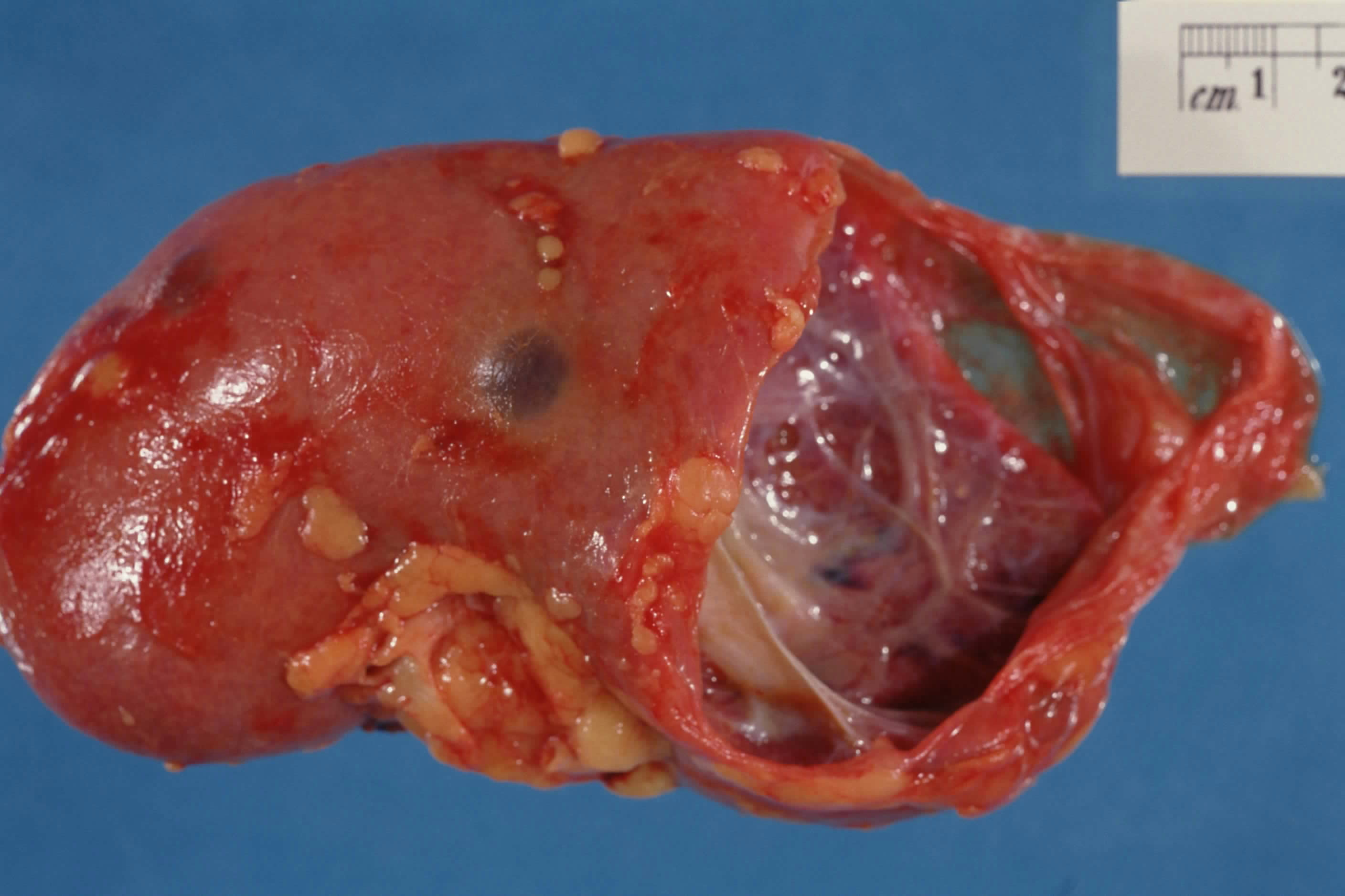
Benign cyst kidney; radiological appearances mimic renal cancer.

A cyst /sɪst/ is a closed sac in the body, having a distinct envelope and division compared with the nearby tissue. Hence, it is a cluster of cells that have grouped together to form a sac (like the manner in which water molecules group together to form a bubble); however, the distinguishing aspect of a cyst is that the cells forming the "shell" of such a sac are distinctly abnormal (in both appearance and behaviour) when compared with all surrounding cells for that given location. A cyst may contain air, fluids, or semi-solid material. A collection of pus is called an abscess, not a cyst. Once formed, a cyst may resolve on its own. Otherwise, it may need to be removed surgically, depending upon its type and location.

Cancer-related cysts are formed as a defense mechanism for the body following the development of mutations that lead to an uncontrolled cellular division. Once such a mutation has occurred, the affected cells divide incessantly and become cancerous, forming a tumor. The body encapsulates those cells to try to prevent them from continuing their division and contain the tumor, which becomes known as a cyst. That said, the cancerous cells still may mutate further and gain the ability to form their own blood vessels, from which they receive nourishment before being contained. Once that happens, the capsule becomes useless, and the tumor may advance from benign to cancerous.

Some cysts are neoplastic, and thus are called cystic tumors. Many types of cysts are not neoplastic but are dysplastic or metaplastic. Pseudocysts are similar to cysts in that they have a sac filled with fluid, but lack an epithelial lining.

== Terminology ==
- microcyst – a small cyst that requires magnification to be seen
- macrocyst – a cyst that is larger than usual or compared to others

== Related structures ==
A pseudocyst is very similar to a cyst, but is a collection of cells without a distinct membrane (epithelial or endothelial cells).

A syrinx in the spinal cord or brainstem is sometimes inaccurately referred to as a "cyst".

== Cysts by location ==
=== Female reproductive system ===
- Nabothian cyst (on the surface of the cervix)
- Ovarian cyst (ovary)
- Paratubal cyst (in front of fallopian tube behind the ovary)

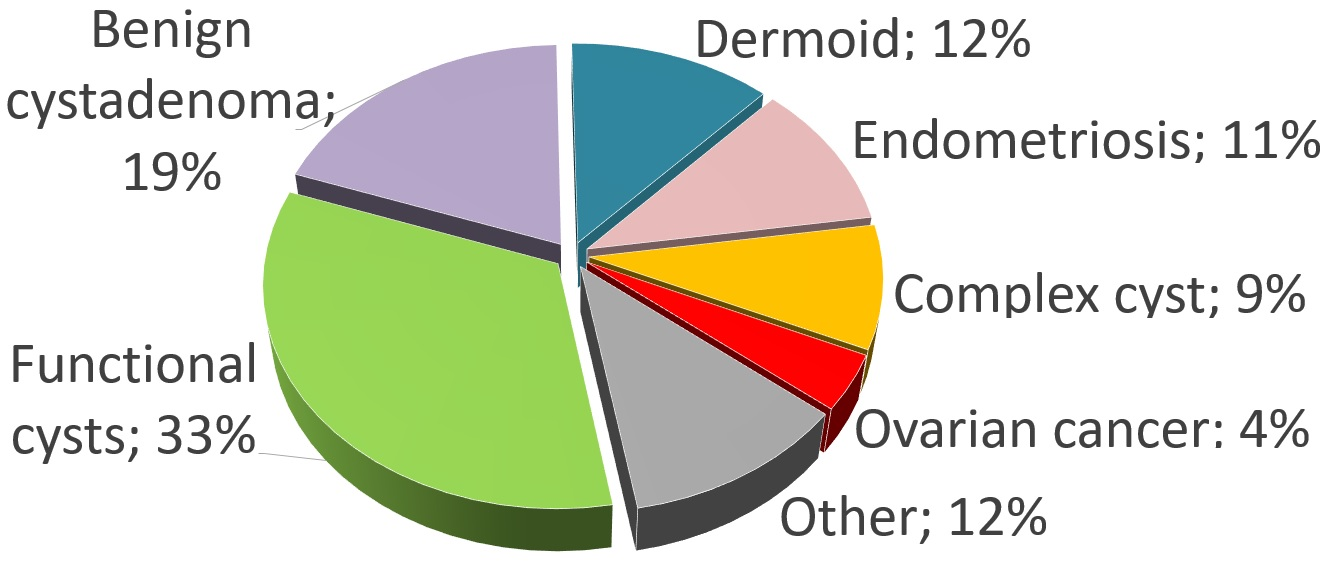
Relative incidences of different types of ovarian cysts

- Vaginal cysts
  - Gartner's duct cyst (lateral to vaginal wall)
  - Bartholin's cyst (at vaginal introitus)
  - Skene's duct cyst (beside the urinary meatus)
  - Ectopic ureterocoele (around the urinary meatus)
  - Urethral diverticulum (in front of vaginal wall)

=== Male reproductive system ===
- Rete tubular ectasia (within the rete testis)
- Epididymal cyst (in the epididymis)
- Hydrocele testis (testicle): clear fluid within the cavum vaginale
- Spermatocele (testicle): fluid within the head of epididymis

=== Cutaneous and subcutaneous ===
- Acne cyst – Pseudocysts associated with cystic acne - an inflammatory nodule with or without an associated epidermoid inclusion cyst
- Arachnoid cyst (between the surface of the brain and the cranial base or on the arachnoid membrane)
- Epidermoid cyst
- Myxoid cyst (cutaneous condition often characterized by nail plate depression and grooves)
- Pilar cyst (cyst of the scalp)
- Pilonidal cyst (skin infection near tailbone)
- Sebaceous cyst – sac below skin
- Trichilemmal cyst – same as a pilar cyst, a familial cyst of the scalp

=== Head and neck ===
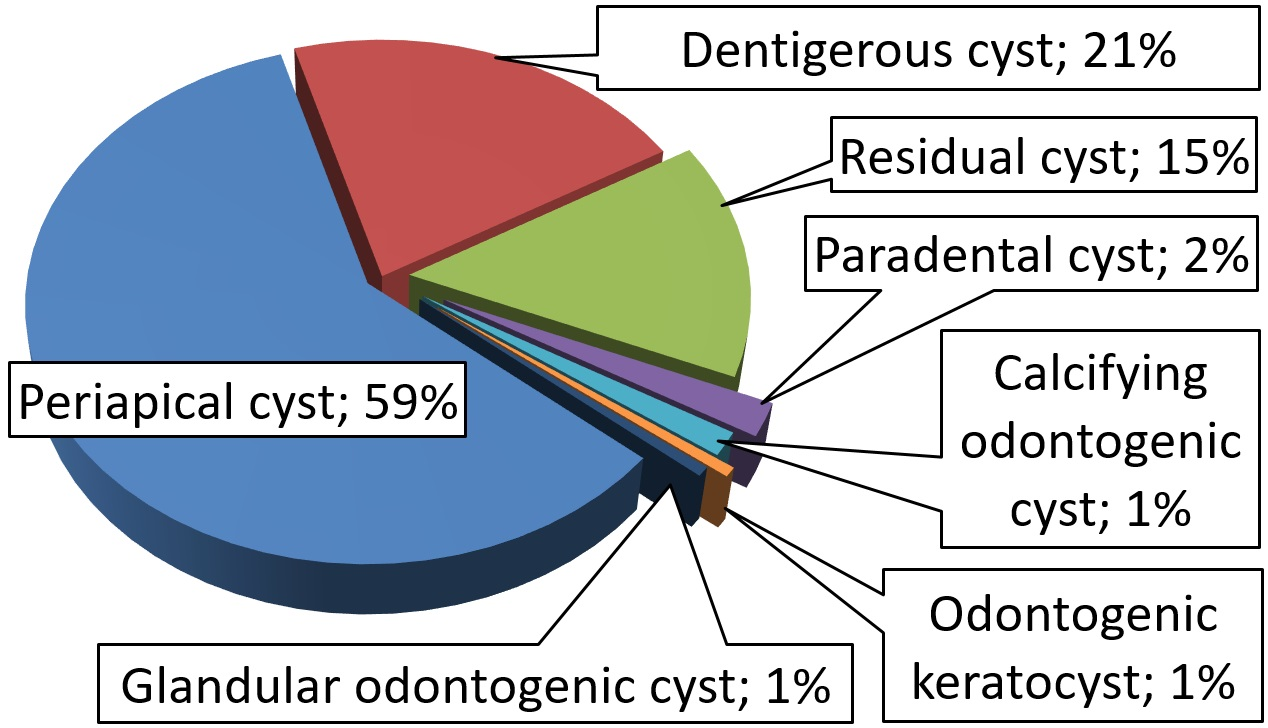
Relative incidence of odontogenic cysts

- Odontogenic cyst
- Ceruminous cyst (ear)
- Chalazion cyst (eyelid)
- Mucous cyst of the oral mucosa
- Nasolabial cyst
- Nasopalatine duct cyst
- Thyroglossal cyst
- Vocal fold cyst

=== Chest ===
- Fibrous cyst (breast cyst)
- Pulmonary cyst (air pocket in the lung)
- Pericardial cyst (abnormal dilatation of pericardium)

=== Abdomen ===
- Liver cysts
  - Simple cysts
  - Hydatid cysts
  - Biliary cystadenoma
  - Biliary cystadenocarcinoma
  - Polycystic liver disease
- Adrenal cyst (glands located above the kidneys) - It is a rare disease, affecting 0.06 to 0.18% of autopsy studies. It constitutes 5.4 to 6.0% of adrenal gland diseases. There are five major types of adrenal cysts: simple or endothelial cysts, true or epithelial cysts, pseudocysts, parasitic cysts, and cysts not classified elsewhere. 7% of the cysts can be malignant.
- Renal cyst (kidneys)
- Pancreatic cyst
- Peritoneal inclusion cyst (lining of the abdominal cavity) - It is a cluster of fluid-filled cysts lining the abdominal cavity of reproductive age women with a history of pelvic, abdominal surgeries, or abdominal inflammation. Those affected maybe presented with an abdominal, pelvic, lower back that lasted for months.
- Enteric duplication cyst

=== Central nervous system ===
- Choroid plexus cyst
- Colloid cyst
- Pineal gland cyst (in the pineal gland in the brain)
- Glial cyst
- Tarlov cyst (spinal canal)

=== Musculoskeletal system ===
- Aneurysmal bone cyst, a benign bone tumor with a radiographic cystic appearance.
- Baker's cyst or popliteal cyst (behind the knee joint)
- Mucoid cyst (ganglion cysts of the digits)
- Stafne static bone cyst (an anatomic variant with radiographic cystic appearance in the posterior mandible)
- Subchondral cyst (cysts near the bony joints)

=== Seen in various locations ===
- Dermoid cyst (seen in ovaries, testes, and many other locations, from head to tailbone)
- Ganglion cyst (hand and foot joints and tendons)
- Mucoid cyst (ganglion cysts of the digits)

== Infectious cysts ==
- Cysticercal cyst – an infection due to the larval stage of Taenia sp. (Crain's backs)
- Hydatid cyst – an infection in the liver or other parts of the body due to the larval stage of Echinococcus granulosus (tapeworm)

== Neoplastic cysts ==
- Dermoid cyst
- Keratocystic odontogenic tumor
- Calcifying odontogenic cyst

== Treatment ==
Treatment ranges from simple enucleation of the cyst to curettage to resection. There are cysts—e.g., buccal bifurcation cyst—that resolve on their own, in which just close observation may be employed, unless it is infected and symptomatic.

== Cystic fibrosis ==
Despite being described in 1938 as "the microscopic appearance of cysts in the pancreas", cystic fibrosis is an example of a genetic disorder whose name is related to fibrosis of the cystic duct (which serves the gallbladder) and does not involve cysts.

This is just one example of how the Greek root cyst-, which simply means a fluid-filled sac, also is found in medical terms that relate to the urinary bladder and the gallbladder, neither of which involve cysts.

== See also ==
- List of cutaneous conditions
- Against a Wen
