= Odontogenic myxoma =

- Specialty: Dentistry

The odontogenic myxoma is an uncommon benign odontogenic tumor arising from embryonic connective tissue associated with tooth formation. As a myxoma, this tumor consists mainly of spindle shaped cells and scattered collagen fibers distributed through a loose, mucoid material.

== Signs and symptoms ==
Odontogenic myxomas have been found in patients ranging in age between 2 and 50 years, however, they are most commonly diagnosed in young adults (specifically between 25 and 35 years of age). The mandible is more likely to be affected than the maxilla. Odontogenic myxomas usually present with bone expansion, asymptomatic cortical perforation, and a multilocular appearance. The region between the molar and premolar is the site of the most common occurrence for multilocular lesions while the anterior portion of the mouth favors a smaller, unilocular variety.

Patients afflicted with an odontogenic myxoma generally notice a painless, slowly enlarging expansion of the jaw with possible tooth loosening or displacement. As the tumor expands, it frequently infiltrates adjacent structures. Maxillary lesions frequently enter the sinuses while mandibular tumors often extend into the ramus.

== Diagnosis ==
Radiographically, odontogenic myxomas appear most commonly as multilocular radiolucencies with ill-defined borders, though unilocular cyst-like tumors can occur, especially when associated with impacted teeth or when discovered in childhood. Ideally, the septa that cause the multilocular feature are thin and straight, producing a tennis racket or stepladder pattern. In reality, the majority of the septa visible in the tumor are curved and coarse, causing a "soap bubble" or "honeycomb" appearance, though locating one or two straight septa can aide in the diagnosis of this tumor.

== Treatment ==
Small unilocular lesions have been successfully treated with enucleation and curettage followed by chemical bone cautery. Multilocular tumors exhibit a 25% recurrence rate and, therefore, must be treated more aggressively. In the case of a multilocular myxoma, resection of the tumor with a generous portion of surrounding bone is required. Tumor enucleation followed by peripheral osteotomy should be considered as the first therapeutic choice. Because of the gelatinous nature of the tumor, it is crucial for the surgeon to remove the lesion intact so as to further reduce the risk of recurrence.
