= Cysts of the jaws =

Sac growths present on the jaw bones

Jaw cysts
- Specialty: Oral and Maxillofacial Surgery, Dentistry

Cysts of the jaws are cysts—pathological epithelial-lined cavities filled with fluid or soft material—occurring on the bones of the jaws, the mandible and maxilla. Those are the bones with the highest prevalence of cysts in the human body, due to the abundant amount of epithelial remnants that can be left in the bones of the jaws. The enamel of teeth is formed from ectoderm (the precursor germ layer to skin and mucosa), and so remnants of epithelium can be left in the bone during odontogenesis (tooth development). The bones of the jaws develop from embryologic processes which fuse, and ectodermal tissue may be trapped along the lines of this fusion. This "resting" epithelium (also termed cell rests) is usually dormant or undergoes atrophy, but, when stimulated, may form a cyst. The reasons why resting epithelium may proliferate and undergo cystic transformation are generally unknown, but inflammation is thought to be a major factor. The high prevalence of tooth impactions and dental infections that occur in the bones of the jaws is also significant to explain why cysts are more common at these sites.

Cysts that arise from tissue(s) that would normally develop into teeth are referred to as odontogenic cysts. Other cysts of the jaws are termed non-odontogenic cysts. Non-odontogenic cysts form from tissues other than those involved in tooth development, and consequently may contain structures such as epithelium from the nose. As the cyst grows from hydraulic pressure it causes the bone around it to resorb, and may cause movement of teeth or other vital structures such as nerves and blood vessels, or resorb the roots of teeth. Most cysts do not cause any symptoms, and are discovered on routine dental radiographs. Some cysts may not require any treatment, but if treatment is required, it usually involves some minor surgery to partially or completely remove the cyst in a one or two-stage procedure.

== Classification ==
=== Odontogenic cysts ===
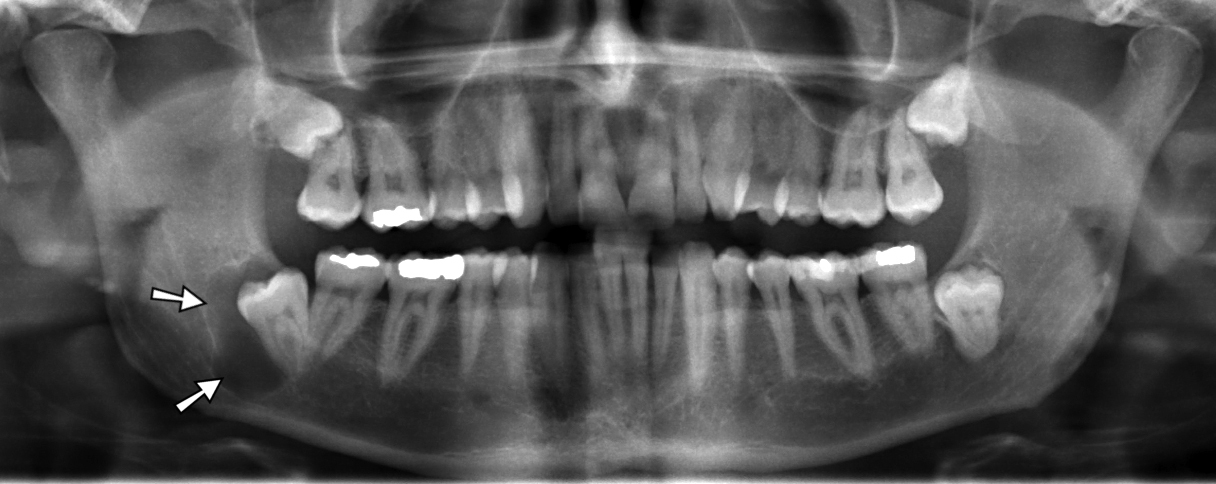
Dental panoramic radiograph showing dentigerous cyst associated with an impacted lower right wisdom tooth in the right mandible (arrowed, appears on the lower left of the image).

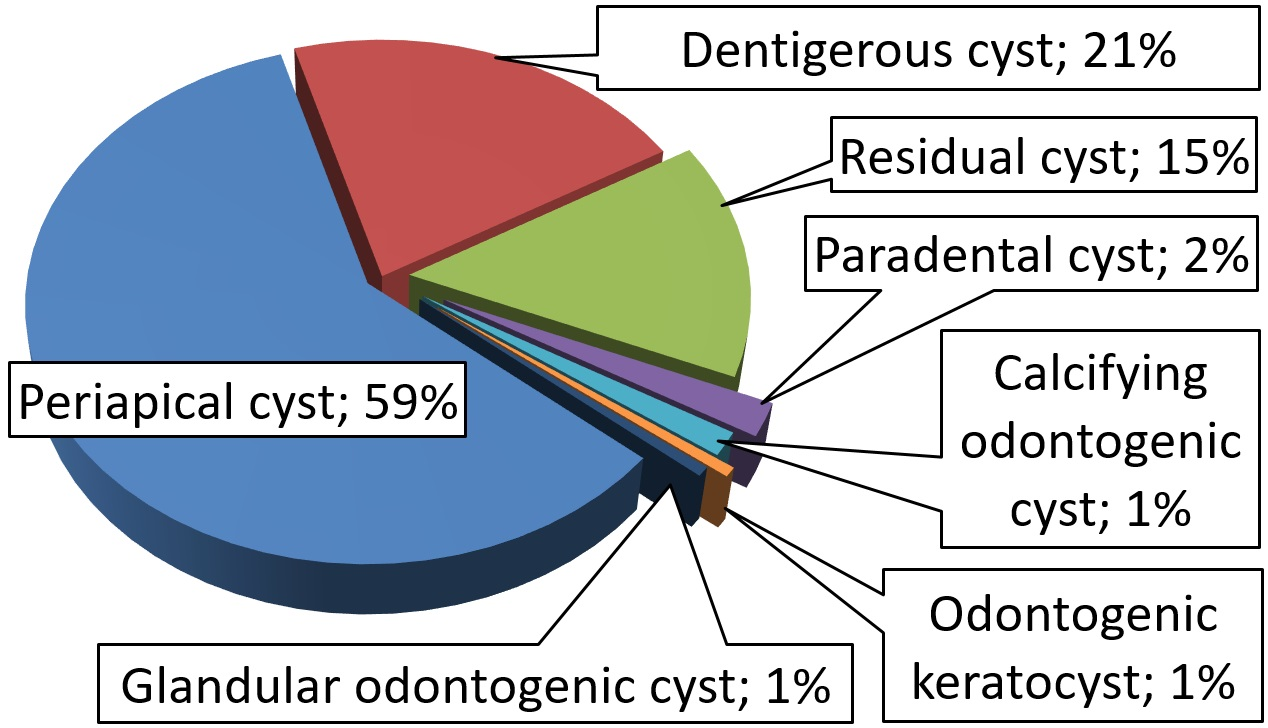
Relative incidence of odontogenic cysts.

Odontogenic cysts have histologic origins in the cells of the dental structures. Some are inflammatory while others are developmental.

- Radicular cyst is the most common (up to two thirds of all cysts of the jaws). This inflammatory cyst originated from a reaction to dental pulp necrosis.
- Dentigerous cyst, the second most prevalent cyst, is associated with the crown of non-erupted tooth.
- Odontogenic keratocyst This lesion may be associated with the Nevoid basal cell carcinoma syndrome.
- Buccal bifurcation cyst which appears in the buccal bifurcation region of the mandibular first molars in the second half of the first decade of life.
- Eruption cyst; a small cyst in the gingiva as a tooth erupts, forming from the degenerating dental follicle
- Primordial cyst; previous thought to be a unique entity. Most primordial cysts have proven to be Keratocystic odontogenic tumors
- Orthokeratinized odontogenic cyst; a variant of the Keratocystic odontogenic tumor
- Gingival cyst of the newborn; an inclusion cyst from remnants of the dental lamina on a newborn gingiva
- Gingival cyst of the adult; a soft tissue variant of the lateral periodontal cyst
- Lateral periodontal cyst; a non-inflammatory cyst (vs a radicular cyst) on the side of a tooth derived from remanents of the dental lamina
- Calcifying odontogenic cyst; a rare lesion with cystic and neoplastic features and significant diversity in presentation, histology and prognosis
- Glandular odontogenic cyst; cyst with respiratory like epithelial lining and the potential for recurrence with characteristics similar to a central variant of low-grade mucoepidermoid carcinoma

=== Developmental/ Non-odontogenic cysts ===
There are several development cysts of the head and neck most of which form in the soft tissues rather than the bone. There are also several cysts, previously thought to arise from epithelial remanents trapped in embryonic lines of fusion, most of which are now believed to be odontogenic in origin or have an unknown cause. Their names are included for the sake of completeness.

==== Developmental cysts of the jaws ====
- Nasopalatine duct cyst, the most common development jaw cyst, appears only in the mid-line of the maxilla.

==== Developmental cysts of the soft tissues around the jaws ====
- Palatal cysts of the newborn (Epstein's pearls)
- Nasolabial cyst (nasoalveolar cyst)
- Epidermoid cyst of the skin
- Dermoid cyst
- Thyroglossal duct cyst
- Branchial cleft cyst (cervical lymphoepithelial cyst)
- Oral lymphoepithelial cyst

==== Developmental cysts of questionable cause ====
- Globulomaxillary cyst
- Median palatal cyst
- Median mandibular cyst

== Signs and symptoms ==
Cysts rarely cause any symptoms, unless they become secondarily infected. The signs depend mostly upon the size and location of the cyst.

If the cyst has not expanded beyond the normal anatomical boundaries of the bone, then there will be no palpable lump outside or inside the mouth. The vast majority of cysts expand slowly, and the surrounding bone has time to increase its density around the lesion, which is the body's attempt to isolate the lesion.

Cysts that have expanded beyond the normal anatomic boundaries of a bone are still often covered with a thin layer of new bone. At this stage, there may be a sign termed "eggshell cracking", where the thinned cortical plate cracks when pressure is applied.

A lump may be felt, which may feel hard if there is still bone covering the cyst, or fluctuant if the cyst has eroded through the bone surrounding it. A cyst may become acutely infected, and discharge into the oral cavity via a sinus. Adjacent teeth may be loosened, tilted or even moved bodily. Rarely, roots of teeth are resorbed, depending upon the type of cyst.

The inferior alveolar nerve runs through the mandible and supplies sensation to the lower lip and chin. As most cysts expand slowly, there will be no altered sensation (anesthesia or paraesthesia), since the inferior alveolar canal is harmlessly enveloped or displaced over time. More aggressive cysts, or acute infection of any cyst may cause altered sensation. Sometimes, they cause higher risk of pathological fracture of lower jaw, especially around angle of mandible.

== Diagnosis ==
Most cysts are discovered as a chance finding on routine dental radiography. They are often asymptomatic unless there has been long-standing with significant enlargement (causing bony expansion or egg-shell cracking feeling) or secondary infection.

On an x-ray, cysts appear as radiolucent (dark) areas with radiopaque (white) borders. However, cysts in maxillary sinus, also known as antrum, can appear radiopaque as the surrounding air absorbs fewer photons than the cystic fluid content.

Cysts are usually unilocular, but may also be multilocular. Sometimes aspiration (fine needle aspiration) is used to aid diagnosis of a cystic lesion; e.g., fluid aspirated from a radicular cyst may appear straw-colored and display shimmering due to cholesterol content. Almost always, the cyst lining is sent to a pathologist for histopathologic examination after it has been surgically removed. This means that the exact diagnosis of the type of cyst is often made in retrospect, and definitive treatment can be made for the patient.

== Treatment ==
As many cysts of the jaws have similar presentations and treatment options, it is common to perform one of the following treatment options and send the cyst lining to histopathology to provide a retrospective definitive diagnosis.

Cysts treatment is limited to surgical removal for the majority of cysts. There are two techniques used to manage cysts with the deciding factor being the size of the cyst.

- Enucleation—removal of the entire cyst. A mucoperiosteal flap is raised overlying the cyst and the entire cyst subsequently removed. The defect is completely closed by the placement of sutures to realign the margins of the flap. Advantages of this technique include: the entire cyst lining is removed for histopathological assessment and reduced post-operative care requirements.
- Marsupialization—the creation of a window into the wall of a cyst by raising a mucoperiosteal flap and attaching the cyst lining to the oral mucosa - allowing the contents to be drained. The window is left open, and the lack of pressure within the cyst causes the lesion to shrink, as the surrounding bone starts to fill in again. With this technique, the window must be prevented from closing by the use of a "plug". As this window is kept open to shrink the size of the cyst, there are additional care requirements. This includes home-based cleaning of the cavity – to remove food debris. Marsupialization may be performed on a dentigerous cyst, allowing the tooth to erupt and prevent extraction.
- Enucleation following marsupialization—marsupialization is carried out as a single procedure, but usually it is followed by a second procedure (enucleation) to remove the cyst. This may be undertaken when cysts are very large, and their removal would leave a significant surgical defect or risk jaw fracture.
- Enucleation with curettage—this is the removal of the cyst and some of the surrounding bone, which may contain remnants of the lining of the cyst. Curettage may be undertaken if the cyst lining is thin and fragile or if the cyst was infected. Following curettage, the defect is irrigated to flush out any debris.

The exception to these treatments; is the management of cysts which have a higher rate of recurrence – for example odontogenic keratocysts. Options to reduce the recurrence rate include: curettage post enucleation, Carnoy's solution (treatment of the cavity with a potent fixative) or mandibular resection. These treatments are less conservative than the above options.

== Prognosis ==
The prognosis depends upon the type, size and location of a cyst. Most cysts are entirely benign, and some may require no treatment. Rarely, some cystic lesions represent locally aggressive tumors that may cause destruction of surrounding bone if left untreated. This type of cyst are usually removed with a margin of healthy bone to prevent recurrence of new cysts. If a cyst expands to a very large size, the mandible may be weakened such that a pathologic fracture occurs.

After treatments, the patient should be informed of the risk of recurrence. Some people are more susceptible than others. This can be due to their oral and dental condition or inherited condition. In some cases, there are some cysts remain after the surgery called the residual cysts and most of them arise from a periapical cyst. Glandular odontogenic cysts tend to recur after curettage.

The radicular cyst is the most common type of cyst(65-70%) followed by dentigerous(15-18%). The most common odontogenic cyst is a follicular(dentigerous) cyst. Rarely, the walls of this type of cyst can progress into mucoepidermoid carcinoma, ameloblastoma or squamous carcinoma if the cyst is not properly removed early enough.

== Epidemiology ==
Periapical cysts (also called radicular cysts) are by far the most common cyst occurring in the jaws.

Jaw cysts affect around 3.5% of the population.^{10} They are more common in males than females at a ratio of 1.6:1 and most people get them between their 40s and 60s. The order of the jaw cysts from most common to least common is; radicular cysts, dentigerous cysts, residual cysts and odontogenic keratocysts. Radicular lesions are most commonly found in the anterior region of the maxilla^{12} – usually around the canines.^{11} The majority of cysts are of inflammatory origin^{12}. They are most commonly found in the posterior mandible^{11}
