= Median palatal cyst =

- Specialty: Oral and maxillofacial surgery

In dentistry median palatal cysts are uncommon hard palate fissural cysts that are not odontogenic. These lesions are located behind the incisive canal in the midline of the hard palate. The majority of the time, median palatine cysts are asymptomatic and are discovered by coincidence while a patient is being evaluated for a different ailment.

Their genesis is commonly ascribed to the enclavement of epithelial remnants between the two lateral maxillary processes that fuse to form the hard palate, within the palatine suture. The median palatal cyst accounts for only 7.14% of all jaw cysts, making it a rare nonodontogenic lesion.

== Signs and symptoms ==
The most common clinical manifestation is painless, fluctuating swelling in the midline across the lingual surface of the palate. Nonetheless, the majority of cases were unintentionally found during routine radiological or dental exams. If the cyst develops an infection or if there is a localized involvement of the nasopalatine nerve, the cysts can get painful.

== Causes ==
According to the most widely accepted theory, it results from aberrant palatal development that occurs during embryogenesis. The sixth fetal week is when the palatal shelves of the maxilla fuse together. Entrapment occurs in the epithelium remnants that surround the two lateral maxillary processes which fuse to form the hard palate. Later in adulthood, the epithelial remnants multiply and take on a cystic form for unclear reasons. Others speculate that they are most likely primordial cysts of redundant dental lamina or extra tooth buds. According to one author, it is more probable that median palatine cysts are nasopalatine cysts that have experienced an unusual amount of posterior displacement.

== Diagnosis ==
A 2001 paper by Hadi et al. provided precise diagnostic standards for midpalatal cysts.

1. The cyst needs to be located behind the palatine papilla.
2. The cyst needs to be grossly symmetrical in the palate's midline.
3. A cyst cannot be connected to a non-vital tooth or have any communication with an incisive canal.
4. It should be ovoid or round radiographically.
5. Histologically, the cyst wall should not have hyaline cartilage, large vascular spaces, or salivary glands.

== Treatment ==
Recurrence is uncommon after the cysts are treated with marsupialization or enucleation.

== Epidemiology ==
Just 7.14% of all jaw cysts are median palatal cysts. Men were affected more frequently than women (4:1), and the age at diagnosis in the cases that have been reported thus far ranged from 20 to 50 years.

== See also ==
- Median alveolar cyst
- Median mandibular cyst
