= Globulomaxillary cyst =

Medical condition

The globulomaxillary cyst is a cyst that appears between a maxillary lateral incisor and the adjacent canine. It exhibits as an "inverted pear-shaped radiolucency" on radiographs, or X-ray films.

The globulomaxillary cyst often causes the roots of adjacent teeth to diverge.

This cyst should not be confused with a nasopalatine cyst.

The developmental origin has been disputed. Today, most literature agree based on overwhelming evidence that the cyst is predominantly of tooth origin (odontogenic), demonstrating findings consistent with periapical cysts, odontogenic keratocysts or lateral periodontal cysts.

== History and dispute ==
The globulomaxillary cyst was first described by K. Thoma in 1937.

In 1970, Thomas F. Christ of Emory University wrote a paper disputing the existence of the globulomaxillary cyst. Out of 36 supposed case reports, only 3 of them seemed plausible.

In 1993, Nisha J. D'Silva and Leigh Anderson, both of the University of Washington, argued that the globulomaxillary cyst exists. They argued that Christ's view of facial development was incorrect, and that fusion of facial processes does in fact occur.

In 2011, a team of researchers at the University of Regensburg analyzed 17 supposed cases of globulomaxillary cysts. Instead, they found seven lateral periodontal cysts, two radicular cysts, two keratocystic odontogenic tumours, one adenomatoid odontogenic tumour, one periapical granuloma, one residual cyst, and one undefined jaw cyst.

== Treatment ==
Treatment is usually by enucleation.
