= Odontogenic keratocyst =

- Other names: Keratocystic odontogenic tumour (KCOT)
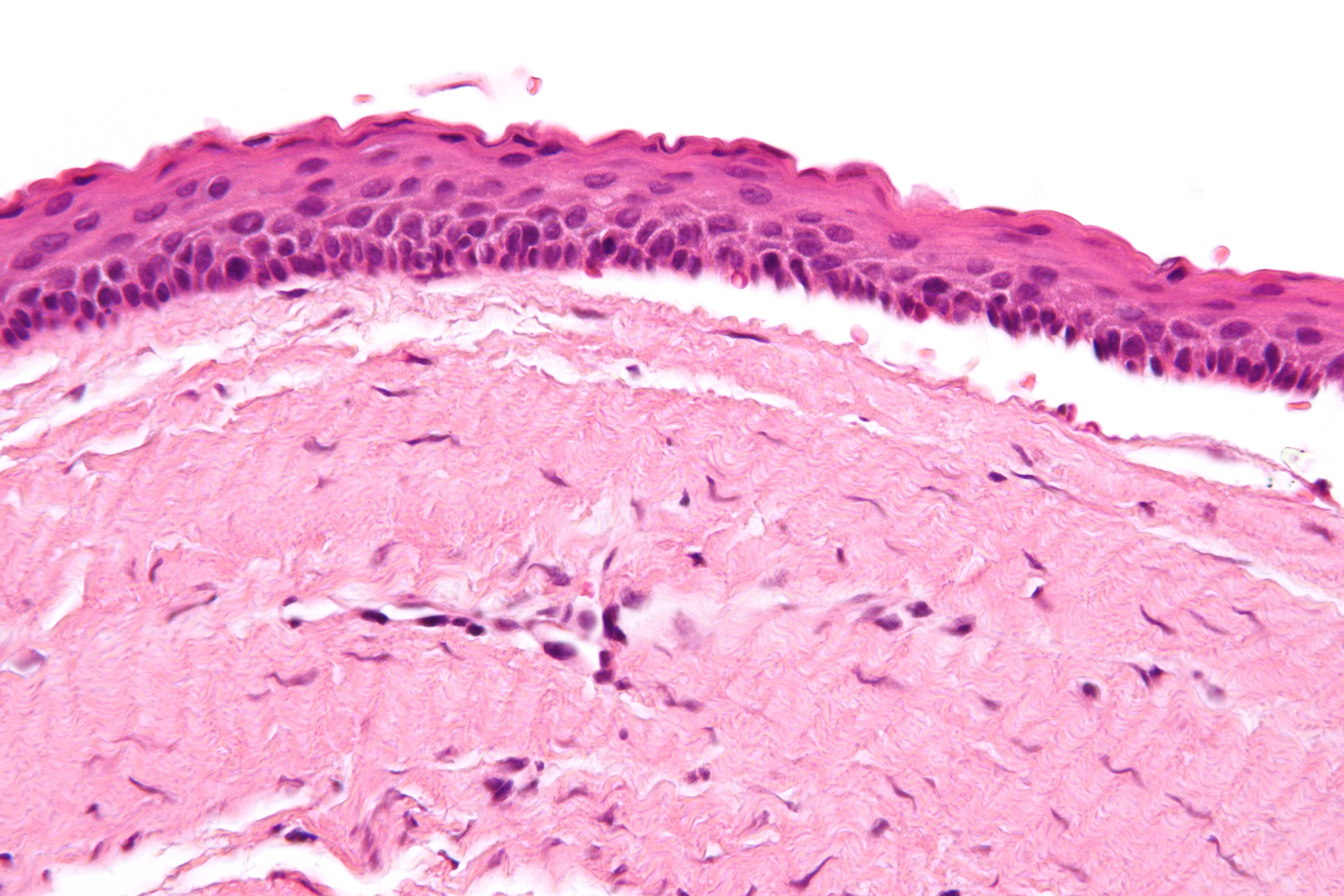
- Micrograph of an odontogenic keratocyst. H&E stain.

An odontogenic keratocyst is a rare and benign but locally aggressive developmental cyst. It most often affects the posterior mandible and most commonly presents in the third decade of life. Odontogenic keratocysts make up around 19% of jaw cysts. Despite its more common appearance in the bone region, it can affect soft tissue.

In the WHO/IARC classification of head and neck pathology, this clinical entity had been known for years as the odontogenic keratocyst; it was reclassified as keratocystic odontogenic tumour (KCOT) from 2005 to 2017. In 2017 it reverted to the earlier name, as the new WHO/IARC classification reclassified OKC back into the cystic category. Under The WHO/IARC classification, Odontogenic Keratocyst underwent the reclassification as it is no longer considered a neoplasm due to a lack of quality evidence regarding this hypothesis, especially with respect to clonality. Within the Head and Neck pathology community there is still controversy surrounding the reclassification, with some pathologists still considering Odontogenic Keratocyst as a neoplasm in line with the previous classification.

== Signs and symptoms ==
Odontogenic keratocysts can occur at any age, however they are more common in the third to sixth decades. The male to female ratio is approximately 2:1. The majority are found in the mandible, with half occurring at the angle of the mandible.

Early odontogenic keratocysts usually do not display symptoms. Typically, clinical signs and symptoms present with bony expansion, or infection. However, bony expansion is uncommon as odontogenic keratocysts grow due to increased epithelial turnover rather than osmotic pressure. When symptoms are present they usually take the form of pain, swelling and discharge due to secondary infection. Odontogenic keratocysts are usually noted as incidental radiographic findings. Radiographically they can be seen as unilocular or multilocular radiolucencies. They can be mistaken for other cysts such as residual cysts or a dentigerous cyst if they occur over an unerupted tooth.

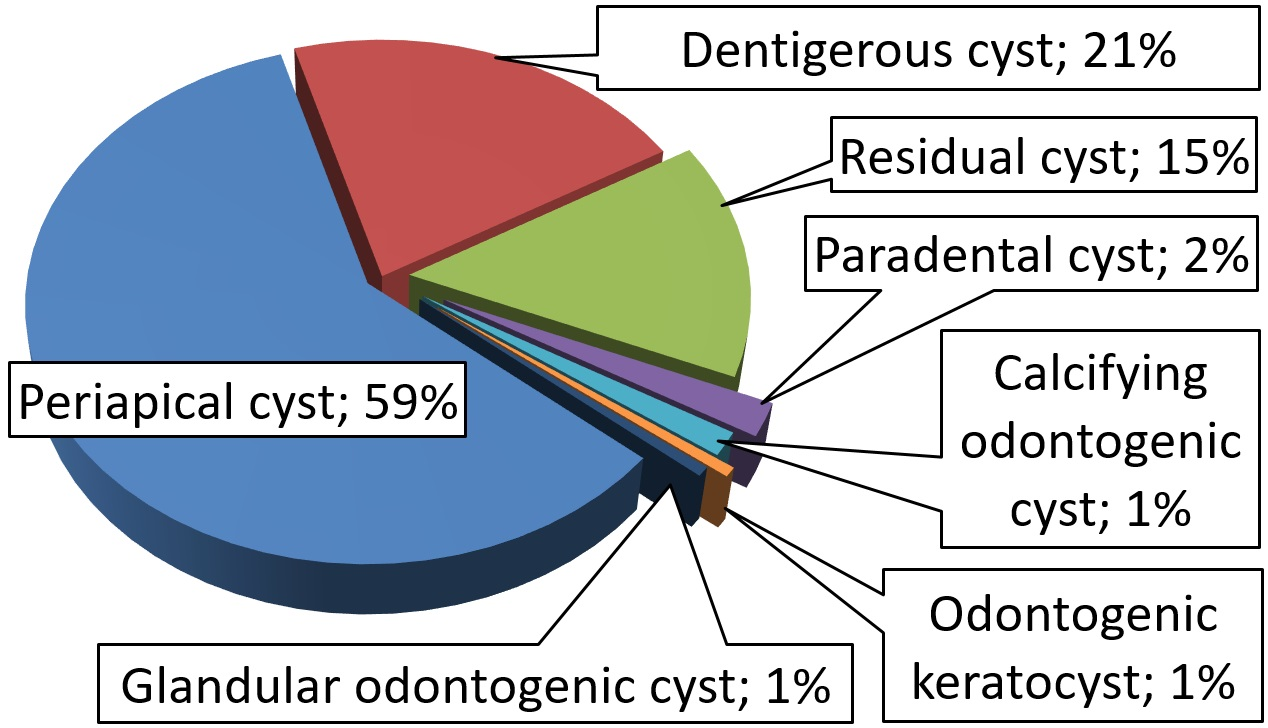
Relative incidence of odontogenic cysts. Odontogenic keratocyst is labeled at bottom right.

== Pathogenesis ==
Odontogenic keratocysts originate from the odontogenic epithelium (dental lamina) in the alveolus left from tooth development stages. They are mainly thought to arise from rests of Serres.

=== Genetics ===
Sporadic (non-syndromic) and syndromic OKCs are associated with mutations in the gene PTCH found on chromosome 9q, which is part of the Hedgehog signaling pathway. PTCH is a tumour suppressor gene. Loss of PTCH activity leads to a brake in the cell cycle. A third of OKCs show mutations in PTCH, resulting in the cyst epithelium undergoing highly proliferative activity. This leads to growth of the cyst wall and when removed favours recurrence if following incomplete removal of the epithelium.

== Nevoid basal-cell carcinoma syndrome ==
Multiple odontogenic keratocysts are a feature, and major diagnostic criteria, of nevoid basal cell carcinoma syndrome (NBCCS, also known as Gorlin-Goltz Syndrome). Almost all individuals with NBCCS have odontogenic keratocysts which require numerous treatments. Consideration of the syndrome needs to be taken into account if found in children or if multiple OKCs are present; diagnosis of multiple OKCs in a child necessitates referral for genetic evaluation. Histologically, the cysts are indistinguishable to non-syndromic cysts and over 80% will have PTCH mutations.

== Diagnosis ==
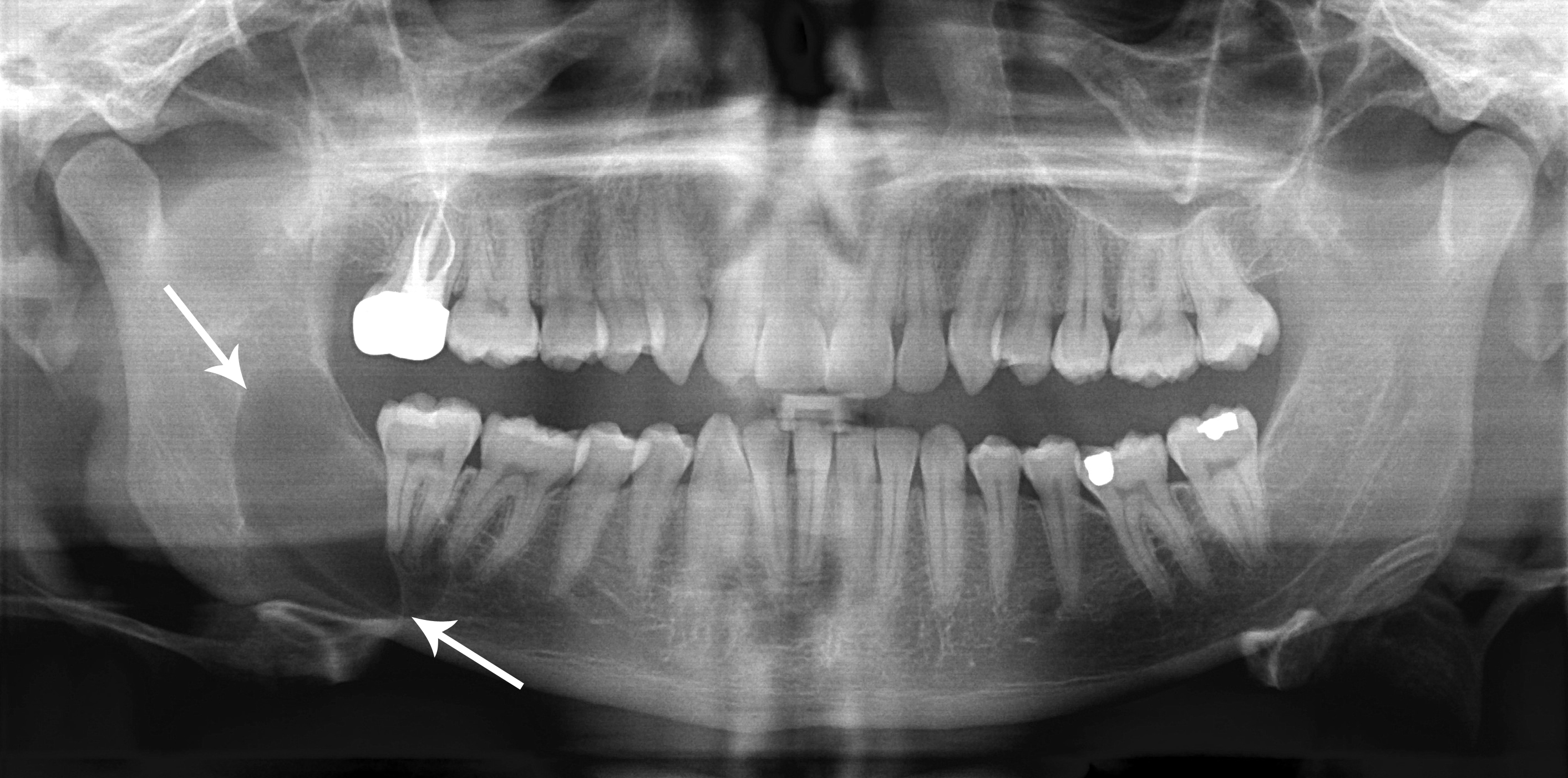
Classic look of an odontogenic keratocyst of the right mandible in the place of a former wisdom tooth. Well defined, unilocular, radiolucent lesion within the bone.

Diagnosis is usually radiological. However, definitive diagnosis is through biopsy. Aspirational biopsy of odontogenic keratocysts contains a greasy fluid which is pale in colour and contains keratotic squames. Protein content of cyst fluid below 4g% is diagnostic of odontogenic keratocysts. Smaller and unilocular lesions resembling other types of cysts may require a biopsy to confirm the diagnosis. On a CT scan, the radiodensity of a keratocystic odontogenic tumour is about 30 Hounsfield units, which is about the same as ameloblastomas. However, ameloblastomas show more bone expansion and seldom show high density areas.

Radiographs of odontogenic keratocysts show well-defined radiolucent areas with rounded or scalloped margins which are well demarcated. These areas can be multilocular or unilocular. The growth pattern of the lesion is very characteristic from which a diagnosis can be made as there is growth and spread both forward and backward along the medullary cavity with little expansion. No resorption of teeth or inferior dental canal and minimal displacement of teeth is seen. Due to lack of expansion of the odontogenic keratocyst, the lesion can be very large when radiographically discovered.

=== Differential diagnosis ===
Radiologically

- Odontogenic myxoma
- Ameloblastoma
- Central giant-cell granuloma
- Adenomatoid odontogenic tumor
- Dentigerous cyst (follicular cyst)

Histologically

- Orthokeratocyst
- Radicular cyst (particularly if the OKC is very inflamed)
- Ameloblastoma

=== Histology ===
Odontogenic keratocysts have a diagnostic histological appearance. Under the microscope, OKCs vaguely resemble keratinized squamous epithelium; however, they lack rete ridges and often have an artifactual separation from their basement membrane.

The fibrous wall of the cyst is usually thin and uninflamed. The epithelial lining is thin with even thickness and parakeratinised with columnar cells in the basal layer which have focal reverse polarisation (nuclei are on the opposite pole of the cell). The basal cells are an indication of the odontogenic origin as they resemble pre-ameloblasts. The epithelium can separate from the wall, resulting in islands of epithelium. These can go on to form 'satellite' or 'daughter' cysts, leading to an overall multilocular cyst. Presence of daughter cysts is particularly seen in those with NBCCS. Inflamed cysts show hyperplastic epithelium which is no longer characteristic of OKCs and can have resemblance to radicular cysts instead. Due to areas of focal inflammation, a larger biopsy is required for correct diagnosis of odontogenic keratocysts.

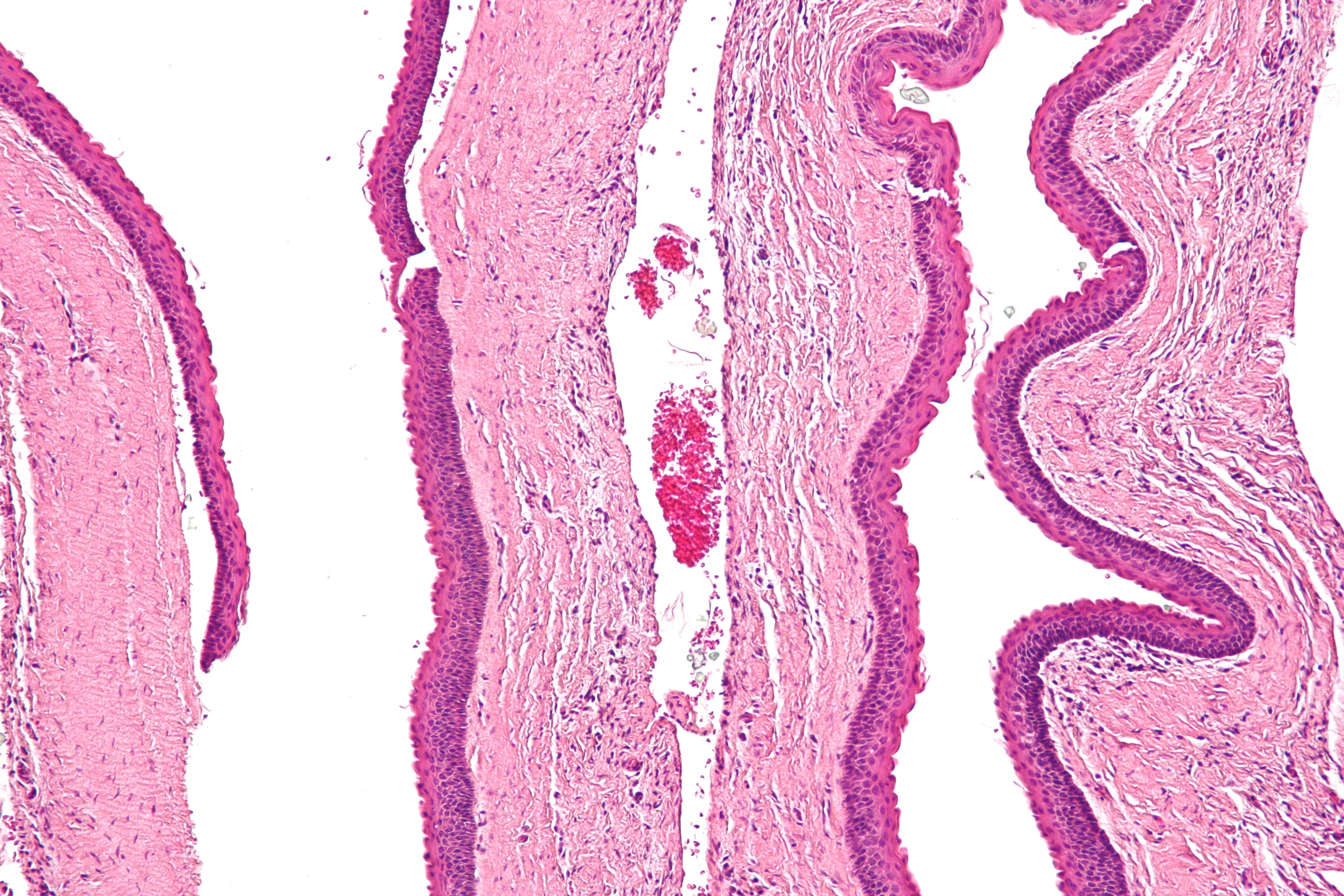
Intermediate magnification of an odontogenic keratocyst showing a folded cyst

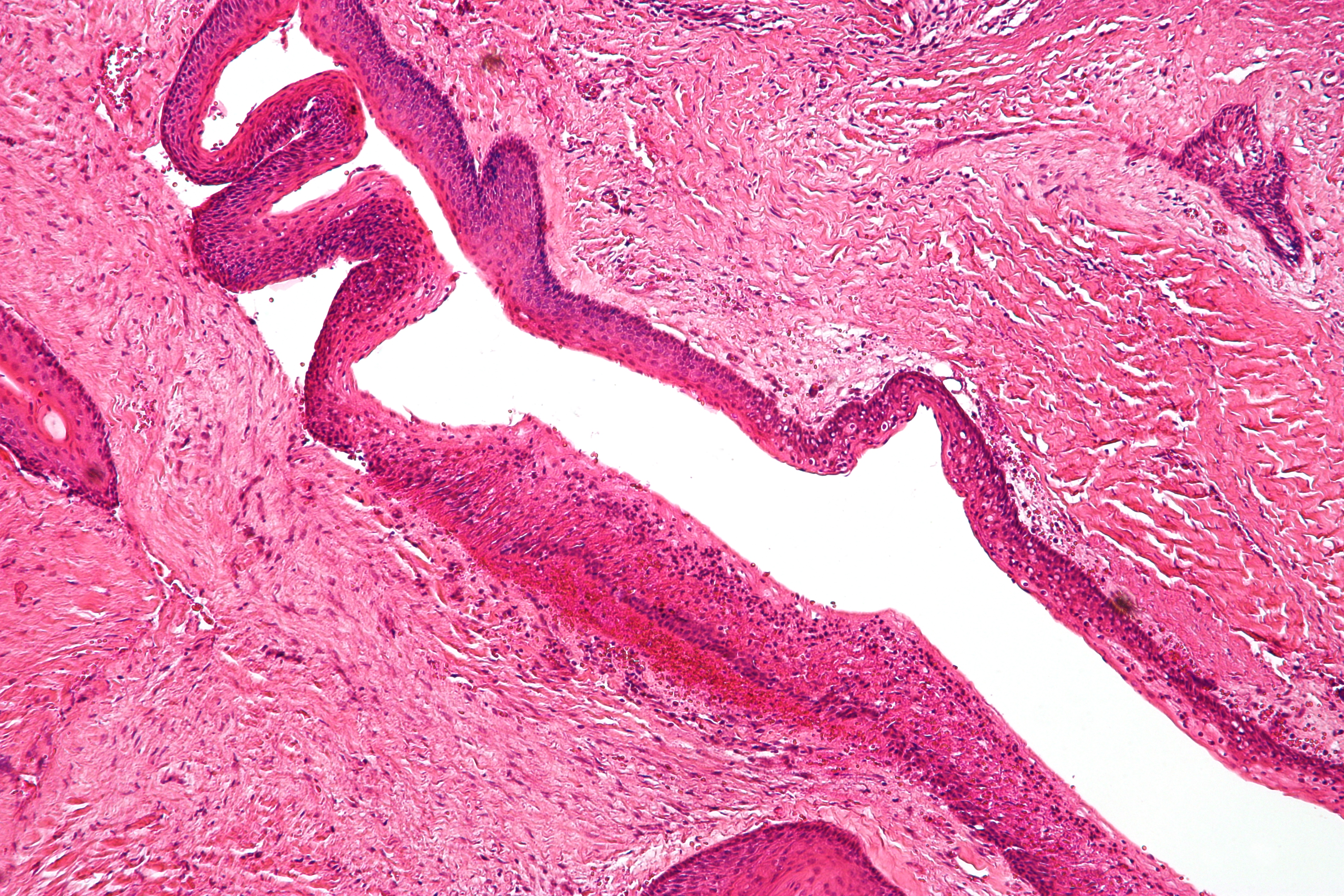
Intermediate magnification of an odontogenic keratocyst

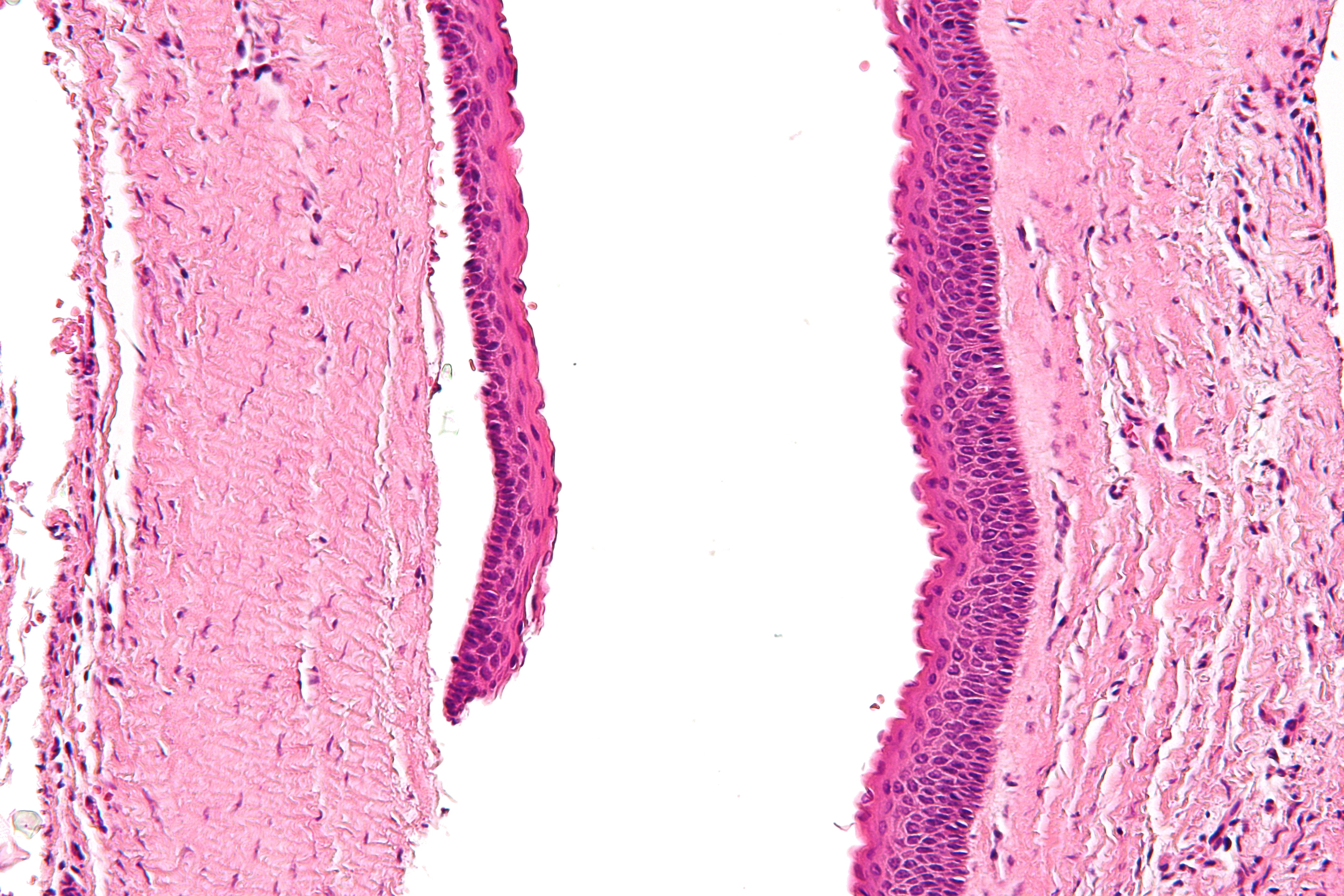
High magnification of an odontogenic keratocyst

== Treatment ==
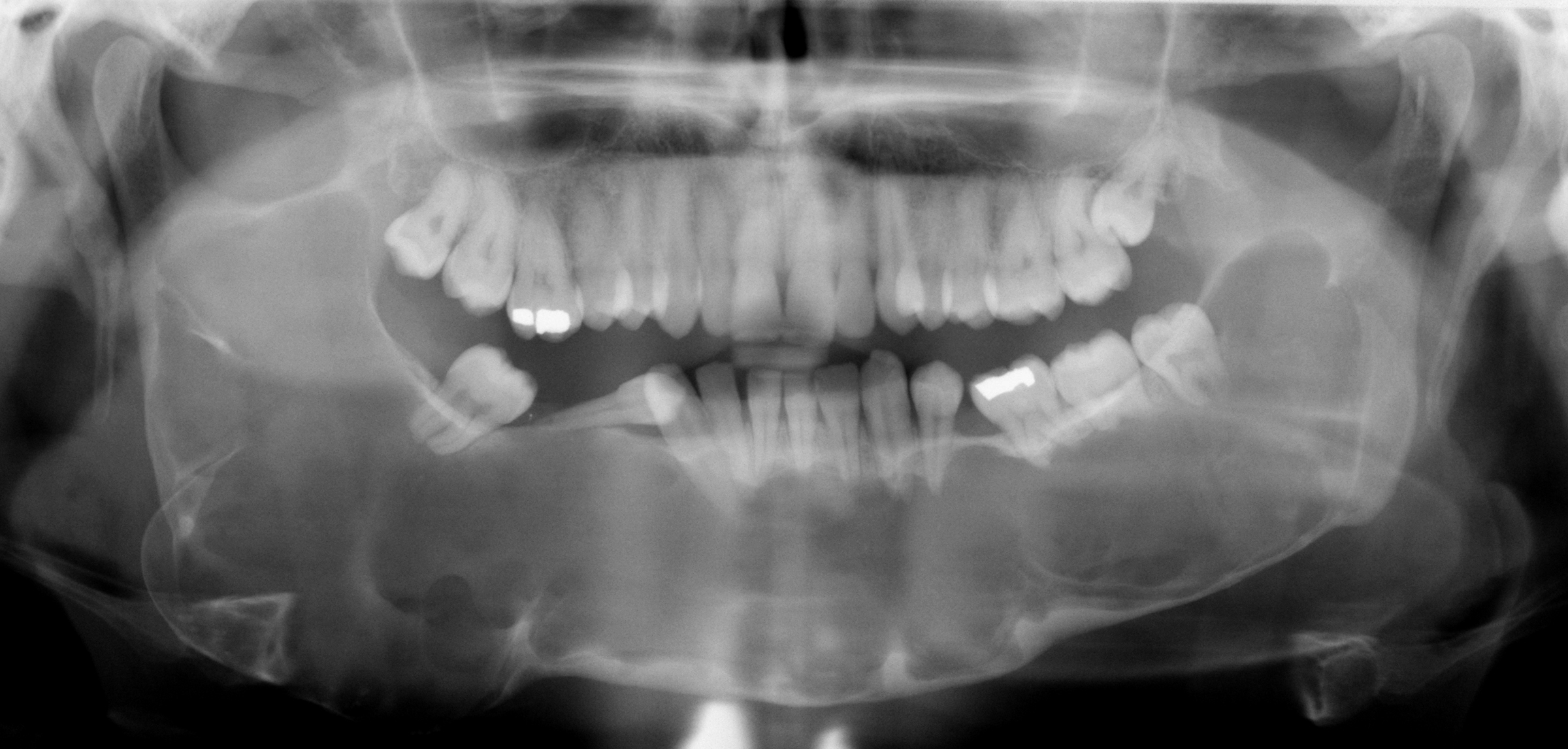
Large odontogenic keratocyst with impacted wisdom teeth superficial to lesion

As the condition is quite rare, opinions among experts about how to treat OKCs differ. A 2015 Cochrane review found that there is currently no high quality evidence to suggest the effectiveness of specific treatments for the treatment of odontogenic keratocysts. A more recent review from 2017 found that the rate of recurrence varies significantly according to some clinical, radiographic, and histopathological features, as well as surgical management. Treatment depends on extent of multilocularity and cyst. Small multilocular and unilocular cysts can be treated more conservatively through enucleation and curretage. Treatment options for KTOC may vary according to its size, extent, site, and adjacent structures.

Treatment options:

- Surgical enucleation: surgical removal of the entire epithelial lining of the cyst.
- Marsupialisation followed by enucleation: this method is carried out by surgeons for larger cysts.
- Curettage involving simple excision and scraping-out of cavity.
- Carnoy's solution fixative (ethanol, chloroform and acetic acid) which is usually used in conjunction with excision and curretage. Cavity wall can be treated with the fixative either before enucleation to kill the lining of the wall or added after curretage to bony walls, killing any residual epithelial cells to a depth of 1-2mm. Used with care near mandibular canal and the neurovascular bundle within.
- Marsupialization which involves the surgical opening of the cyst cavity and a creation of a marsupial-like pouch. This allows the cavity to be in contact with the outside of the cyst for an extended period of time. Marsupialisation results in slow shrinkage of the cyst allowing later enucleation. However, resolution can take up to 20 months and patients are required to clean the open cavity and irrigate it.
- Peripheral ostectomy after curettage and/or enucleation. Extensive cysts may require a bone graft after bone resection and reconstruction of the area.
- Simple excision
- Enucleation and cryotherapy. Decompression followed by enucleation has been shown to be most successful with lowest recurrence rates.
- Topical application of 5FU after enucleation
- Ostectomy or En – bloc resection: in addition to the above treatments, these may be required due to the issue of recurrence. Ostectomy is removal of peripheral bone. En – block resection is removal of the cyst with the surrounding tissue. Extensive cysts may require a bone graft after bone resection and reconstruction of the area.

=== Follow-up ===
Annual radiographic review has been recommended. Long-term clinical follow-up is also recommended due to recurrences occurring many years after treatment.

=== Recurrence and neoplastic nature ===
Malignant transformation to squamous cell carcinoma may occur, but is unusual.

Recurrence is likely when treated by simple enucleation. Contributing causes include thin and fragile epithelium leading to incomplete removal, cyst extensions extending into cancellous bone, satellite cysts found in the wall, experience of the surgeon, formation of further new cysts from other remnants of the dental epithelium. With current treatment techniques the recurrence rate is around 2-3% but can be as high as 50%. Recurrence can occur as early as 5 years and as late as 40 years after removal. Recurrence is usually seen within 5 years of treatment. Early findings of recurrence can be easily treated with minor surgery and curretage. Any fragment of the cyst that is left behind has the potential to survive and grow. Therefore, the success of enucleation depends on how well the cyst is removed. Larger cysts have a higher rate of recurrence after enucleation as they are more difficult to remove.

Pronto genie keratocysts are well known to recur in the posterior mandible. A substantial amount of odontogenic keratocysts also recur in the tooth-bearing area of the jaws, requiring attention from clinicians.

The neoplastic nature of odontogenic keratocysts has been debated. Due to high recurrence rate, late detection when the cyst has grown very large and causation by tumour suppressor gene inactivation, some have classified OKCs as benign neoplasms. The best evidence to suggest that this type of cyst is not a neoplasm is that it responds very well to marsupialisation.

== See also ==
- Cysts of the jaws
