= Carnoy's solution =

Fixative solution

Carnoy's solution is a fixative composed of 60% ethanol, 30% chloroform and 10% glacial acetic acid, 1 gram of ferric chloride.

Carnoy's solution is also the name of a different fixation composed of ethanol and glacial acetic acid (3:1).

The invention of Carnoy's solution is attributed to Jean-Baptiste Carnoy, a pioneering 19th century cytologist.

== Uses ==
Some of the uses of Carnoy's solution are:

- Enhancing lymph node detection during dissection of cadavers.
- Immunohistochemical fixation and detection of NMDA receptors within the murine hippocampus.
- Applied directly following enucleation for the treatment of odontogenic keratocysts.
- Direct application following enucleation (Cuba) for certain kinds of unicystic ameloblastomas. This appears to decrease the likelihood of recurrence over enucleation alone. Protein coagulation is thought to limit uptake of these toxic materials by surrounding tissues, however it is this fact that limits its usefulness as a treatment agent in general.
- As a fixative for pap smear samples.
- As a fixative agent for both nuclear and mitochondrial DNA in various tissues.
- As a fixative agent to preserve mucus, useful for tissue preparation before staining with periodic acid-Schiff base.
