= Lateral periodontal cyst =

Cysts located adjacent to the root of a vital tooth

"Lateral periodontal cysts (LPCs) are defined as non-keratinised and non-inflammatory developmental cysts located adjacent or lateral to the root of a vital tooth." LPCs are a rare form of jaw cysts, with the same histopathological characteristics as gingival cysts of adults (GCA). Hence LPCs are regarded as the intraosseous form of the extraosseous GCA. They are commonly found along the lateral periodontium or within the bone between the roots of vital teeth, around mandibular canines and premolars. Standish and Shafer reported the first well-documented case of LPCs in 1958, followed by Holder and Kunkel in the same year although it was called a periodontal cyst. Since then, there has been more than 270 well-documented cases of LPCs in literature.

== Signs and symptoms ==
Observable clinical signs of a LPC include a small, soft-tissue swelling found just below or within the interdental papilla. However, as it is usually asymptomatic in nature, LPCs are usually detected through radiography.

On radiographs, the LPC appears with a well-defined round, oval or sometimes tear-drop shape. It also has an opaque outline along the edge of the tooth root. In rare situations, possible implications include loss of enamel and dentine of adjacent teeth, loss of lamina dura and enlargement of the periodontal ligament space.

Under the microscope, the LPC is seen as a cystic cavity with a thin layer of epithelium along its margin and held up by a connective tissue. In most cases, no inflammatory cells cells are present, but in some rare instances, inflammation in the fibrous capsule can be observed. Many transparent cells rich in glycogen can found in either plaques or in the outermost epithelium layers. There is often thickening of the epithelium or plaque formation seen.

== Formation and pathophysiology ==
The origin of the LPC remains controversial, with extensive debate in the literature over the different hypotheses. Base on the findings, the pathogenesis of LPC may be related to three etiopathological hypotheses.

=== Reduced enamel epithelium ===
The hypothesis suggested that the cyst is lined by nonkeratinized epithelium reminiscent of the reduced enamel epithelium which is supported by PCNA immunohistochemical expression.

=== Remnants of dental lamina ===
LPC histopathologically presents glycogen-rich clear cells, which are also seen in the dental lamina. Therefore, LPC might be related to dental lamina remnants.

=== Cellular remnants of Malassez ===
The epithelial cell rests of Malassez presented in the roots surface, principal location of the LPC, play a role in LPC formation.

Several additional theories had been proposed regarding the origin of lateral periodontal cysts, including the possibility that the lesions may arise as a result of pulpal infection manifesting itself in a lateral position or chronic periodontal disease activating the rests of Malassez.

== Diagnosis, prognosis and predictive factors ==
Lateral periodontal cysts are asymptomatic and are usually exposed in patients routine radiography. The onset of lateral periodontal cyst are insidious and subtle, with a yearly growth rate of 0.7 mm. Adjacent teeth vitality is of great importance when contemplating a pre-surgical working diagnosis of lateral periodontal cyst as missing adjacent teeth or past endodontic treatment would affect and confuse the differential diagnosis. It is rare but have been reported in literature that cysts can display mandibular or maxillary bone expansion, bone perforation and overlying gingiva communication.

Lateral periodontal cysts radiographically present as a rounded, teardrop shape that are usually less than 10mm in size, presenting with a uni-cystic well-delineated radiolucency. Lesions are situated usually between the tooth lateral surface between the root apex and alveolar crest. A prominent cortical boundary is also usually observed. Associated teeth root divergence and absorption is seldom observed, with loss of periodontal ligament space and lamina dura also possible.

Lateral periodontal cysts have to undergo surgical removal by excision or conservative enucleation, with post surgery radiographic follow up for several years, monitoring recurrence. Bone regeneration within the bony defect usually occurs from 6 months to 1 year. Recurrence is unlikely but have occurred and reported in literature. Root divergence due to lateral periodontal cysts are normalised or reduced after surgical treatment, without orthodontic intervention required. Squamous cell carcinoma development has been reported within literature to occur in lateral periodontal cysts.

== Classification ==
Lateral periodontal cysts can be classified into two morphological types: Unicystic and Multicystic.

Botryoid odontogenic cyst (BOC) was once classified as one type of LPC by Altini and Shear in 1992. It was opposed by Van der Waal in the same year as he stated that BOC extends well beyond the lateral area of root, therefore should not be considered as a variant of LPC. But it is possible that the cells of origin for both cysts are the same.

== Treatment and management ==
Successful treatment of LPC consists of surgical removal of the lesion by conservative enucleation with guided bone regeneration technique (GBR) with xenograft and resorbable collagen membrane. This is often achieved without affecting the periodontal health of adjacent teeth. Periodic radiographic follow-up monitoring of the patient for any recurrence is also recommended. Typically, bone regeneration of the bony defect is achieved within 6–12 months, by placing an osteoconductive bone substitute material into the defect and covering it with a barrier membrane (such as a resorbable collagen barrier membrane (RCM)). The reported recurrence rate remains very low. LPC is usually reported as a coincidental finding during routine radiograph analysis, and usually does not show any symptoms due to its non-inflammatory nature, unless the cystic lesion is subject to secondary infection.
