= Eruption cyst =

Bluish swelling that occurs on the soft tissue over an erupting tooth

An eruption cyst, or eruption hematoma, is a bluish swelling that occurs on the soft tissue over an erupting tooth. It is usually found in children. The fluid in the cyst is sometimes clear creating a pale-coloured cyst although often they are blue. An eruption cyst (eruption hematoma) is a developmental soft-tissue cyst of odontogenic origin that forms over an erupting tooth. most commonly seen anterior to first molar

== Clinical features ==
- common in children while rare in other ages and found in both dentition
- forms superficially in the gingiva overlying the involved erupting tooth as soft, rounded and bluish swelling.

== Histopathological features ==
- The epithelial lining of eruption cyst is similar to that of the dentigerous cyst (non-keratinized stratified squamous epithelium), so the eruption cyst is considered a superficial dentigerous cyst.
- The fibrous capsule shows inflammatory cells possibly as a result of trauma.
- The epithelial lining of the cyst is separated from the alveolar mucosa by a thin layer of fibrous tissue with the epithelial tags of cystic epithelium facing those of the alveolar mucosa.
- The cystic cavity may contain blood in addition to the yellowish protein fluid as a result of trauma.

== Management ==
- The cyst roof may be drained with its fluid to allow the tooth to erupt although most of them burst spontaneously.
