= Calcifying epithelial odontogenic tumor =

Odontogenic tumor

The calcifying epithelial odontogenic tumor (CEOT), also known as a Pindborg tumor, is an odontogenic tumor first recognized by the Danish pathologist Jens Jørgen Pindborg in 1955. It was previously described as an adenoid adamantoblastoma, unusual ameloblastoma and a cystic odontoma. Like other odontogenic neoplasms, it is thought to arise from the epithelial element of the enamel origin. It is a typically benign and slow growing, but invasive neoplasm.

== Types ==
Intraosseous tumors (tumors within the bone) are more common (94%) than extraosseous tumors (6%). It is more common in the posterior mandible of adults, typically in the fourth to fifth decades. There may be a painless swelling, and it is often concurrent with an impacted tooth. On radiographs, it appears as a radiolucency (dark area) and is known for sometimes having small radiopacities (white areas) within it. In those instances, it is described as having a "driven-snow" appearance. Microscopically, there are deposits of amyloid-like material. The underlying nature of the amyloid-like material is still unresolved.

== Clinical features ==
Clinically it has two types, the central and the peripheral. The central type of the CEOT occurs in individuals ranging in age from 20 to 60 years. Two-thirds of the lesions are in jaws, more commonly in the molar area with a tendency to occur in the pre-molar areas. It appears clinically to be a slowly enlarging painless mass. In the maxilla it can cause proptosis, epistaxis and nasal airway obstruction. The peripheral type is commonly found in the anterior region of the maxilla and occurs as a soft tissue swelling.

== Histology ==
Histopathology will reveal prominent intercellular bridges and nuclear changes such as pleomorphism, hyperchromatism and prominent nucleoli. The mitotic figures are rare. Spread throughout the epithelium and connective tissue are spherical amorphous calcifications.

Variants include the clear cell CCEOT; whose cells have clear cytoplasms. The incidence is low, with 15 cases of CCEOT reported. However, another study has indicated that approximately 8% of CEOTs contain clear cells.

There is one case reported in the literature of a 15-year-old white male with a true cystic variant of CEOT.

== Recurrence ==
The recurrence rate is 10-15%. Franklin and Pindborg reported a recurrence rate of 14%. It is considered to have a recurrence rate much lower than that of ameloblastoma. Malignant metastasis has been reported.

== See also ==
- ODAM (gene)
- Proteopathy
- Tooth development
