= Alois Epstein =

Czech pediatrician

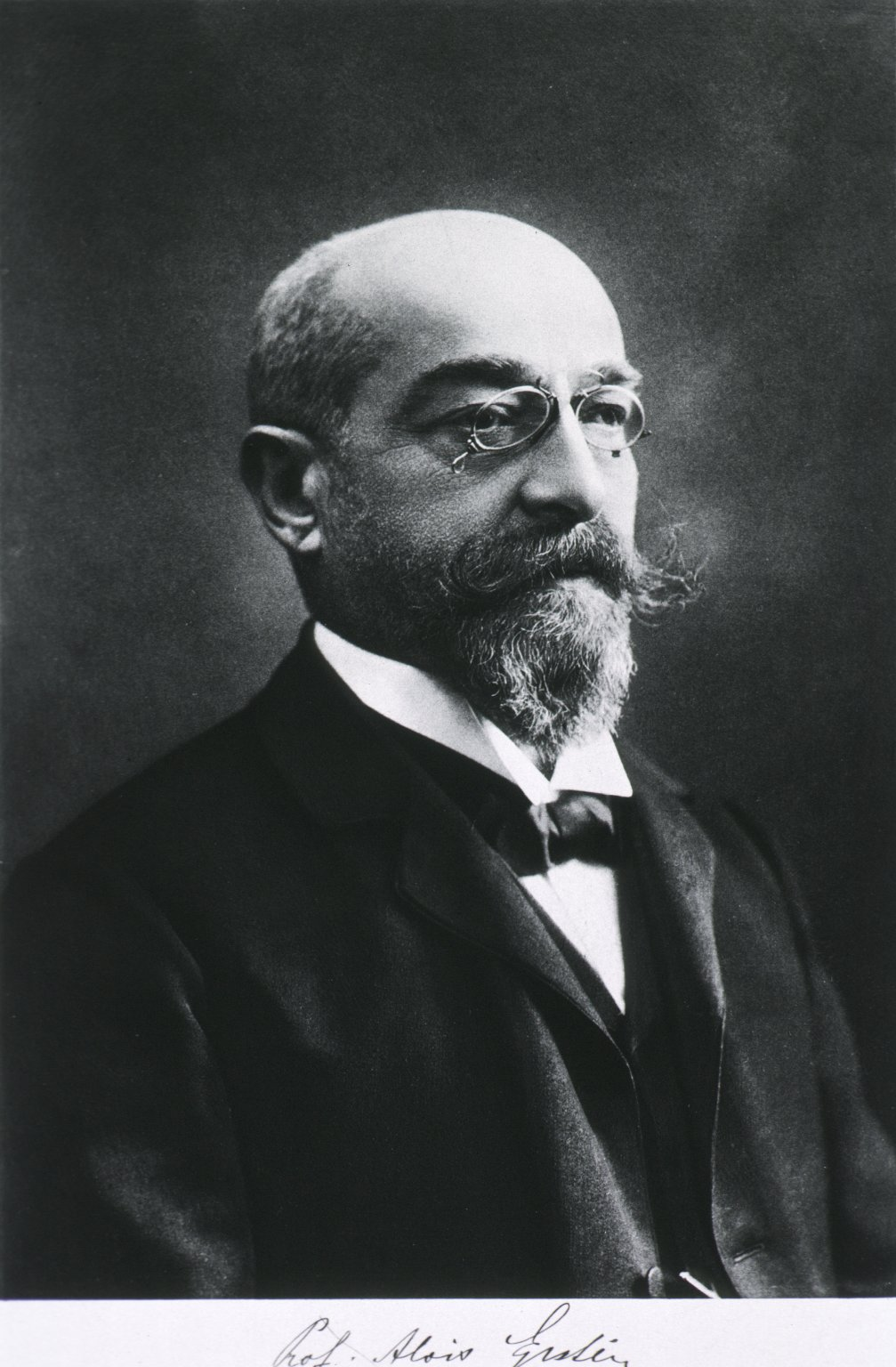
Epstein, c. 1910

Alois Epstein (1 January 1849 in Kamenice nad Lipou – 27 October 1918) was a Czech paediatrician of Jewish ancestry remembered for describing Epstein's pearls. He studied at the University of Prague, graduating M.D. in 1873. He worked as a physician in Prague, becoming privat-docent in paediatrics in 1880, and professor of paediatrics in 1884.
