= Mucoperiosteum =

Compound chemical structure

Mucoperiosteum is a compound structure consisting of mucous membrane and underlying periosteum. It includes epithelium and lamina propria, but attaches directly to the periosteum of underlying bone without the usual submucosa. It consists of loose fatty or glandular tissues; with blood vessels & nerve fibres that supply the mucosa.

It can be found in the midline of the hard palate, the palatine raphe, among other places.
