= Maxillary process =

Maxillary process is commonly an alternate name for the maxillary prominence.

Maxillary process may also refer to the maxillary process of inferior nasal concha, which curves downward and laterally; it articulates with the maxilla and forms a part of the medial wall of the maxillary sinus.
