= Primordial cyst =

Tooth development malformation

A primordial cyst is a developmental odontogenic cyst. It is found in an area where a tooth should have formed but is missing. Primordial cysts most commonly arise in the area of mandibular third molars. Under microscopes, the cyst looks like an odontogenic keratocyst (also called a Keratocyst odontogenic tumor) whereby the lesions displays a parakeratinized epithelium with palisading basal epithelial cells.

The term "Primordial cyst" is considered an outdated term and should be avoided. Most "primordial cysts" are actually Keratocyst odontogenic tumors (KOT's).
