= Gingival cyst =

- Other names: Dental lamina cyst
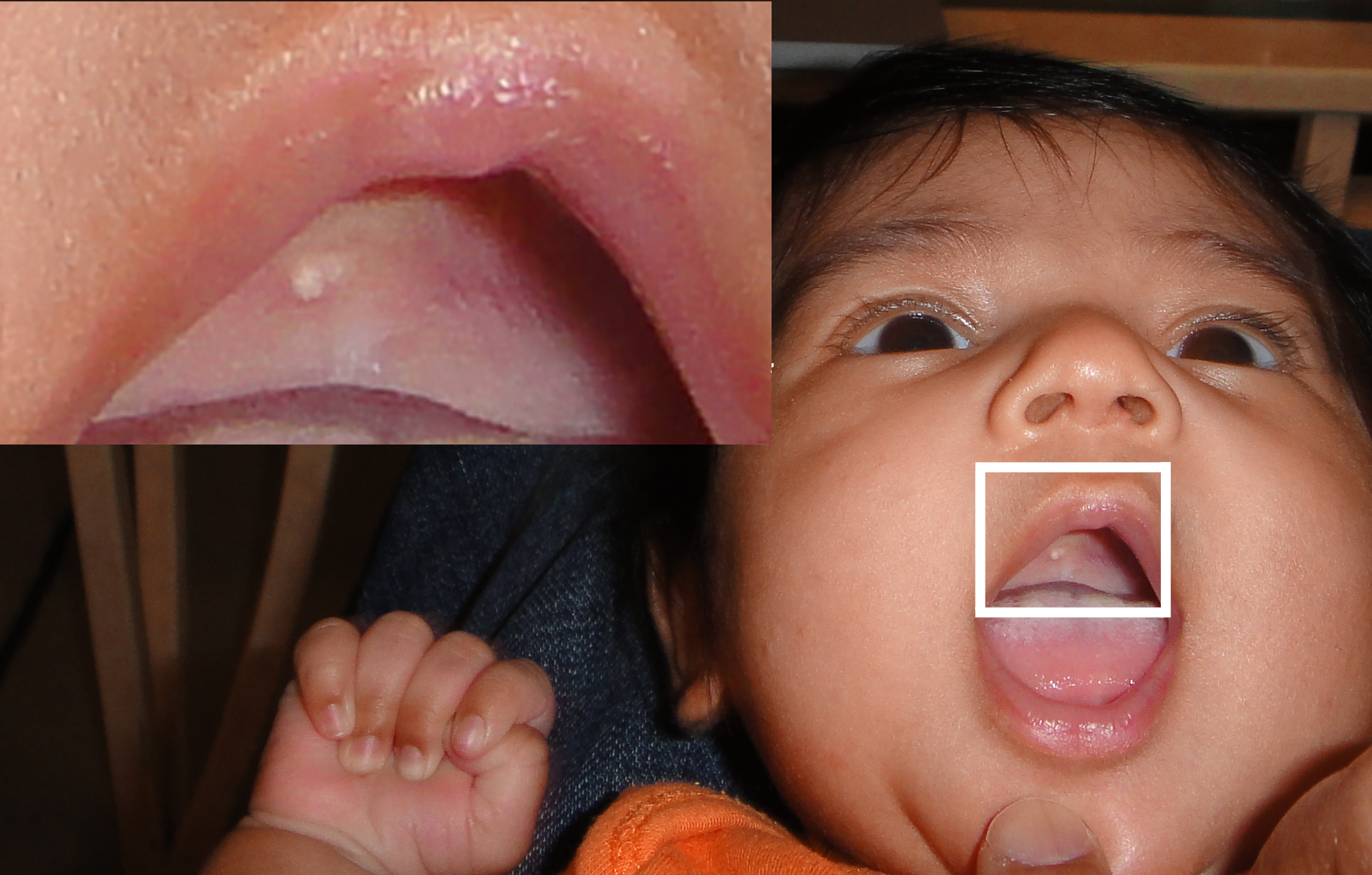
- Epstein's pearl shown in the roof of the mouth on a five-week-old infant
- Specialty: Dentistry

Gingival cyst, also known as Epstein's pearl, is a type of cysts of the jaws that originates from the dental lamina and is found in the mouth parts. It is a superficial cyst in the alveolar mucosa. It can be seen inside the mouth as small and whitish bulge. Depending on the ages in which they develop, the cysts are classified into gingival cyst of newborn (or infant) and gingival cyst of adult. Structurally, the cyst is lined by thin epithelium and shows a lumen usually filled with desquamated keratin, occasionally containing inflammatory cells. The nodes are formed as a result of cystic degeneration of epithelial rests of the dental lamina (called the rests of Serres).

Gingival cyst was first described by a Czech medical doctor Alois Epstein in 1880. In 1886, a German medical doctor Heinrich Bohn described another type of cyst. Alfred Fromm introduced the classification of gingival cysts in 1967. According to him, gingival cysts of newborns can be further classified based on their specific origin of the tissues as Epstein’s pearls, Bohn’s nodules and dental lamina cysts.

== Babies ==
Gingival (alveolar) cysts of infants are mostly found in groups, but are frequently found as single nodules. They are present on the alveolar ridges. They are formed from fragments of dental lamina that remains within the alveolar ridge mucosa during tooth formation (odontogenesis). Specifically, they emerge when the process of formation extends into the abnormal sites to form small keratinized cysts. They are generally harmless (asymptomatic) and do not cause discomfort, and they normally degenerate and involutes or rupture into the oral cavity within 2 weeks to 5 months after birth. Hence, they are not normally recognized and do not require medical treatment. It is estimated that the prevalence is higher than 50% in babies. Depending on their exact occurrence, the cysts can be classified into palatal and alveolar cysts. Palatine cysts are those located at the mid-palatine raphe, while alveolar cysts are found on the buccal, lingual or crest of alveolar ridge.

=== Epstein’s pearl ===
Epstein’s pearls were discovered by Alois Epstein in 1880. They are palatal cysts found along the median palatal raphae and arise from the epithelium entangled along the line of fusion. They are small white or yellow cystic vesicles (1 to 3 mm in size) often seen in the median palatal raphe of the mouth of newborn infants (occur in 60-85% of newborns). They are typically seen on the roof of the mouth (palate) and are filled with keratin. They are caused by entrapped epithelium (fissural cyst) during the development of the palate.

=== Bohn’s nodules ===
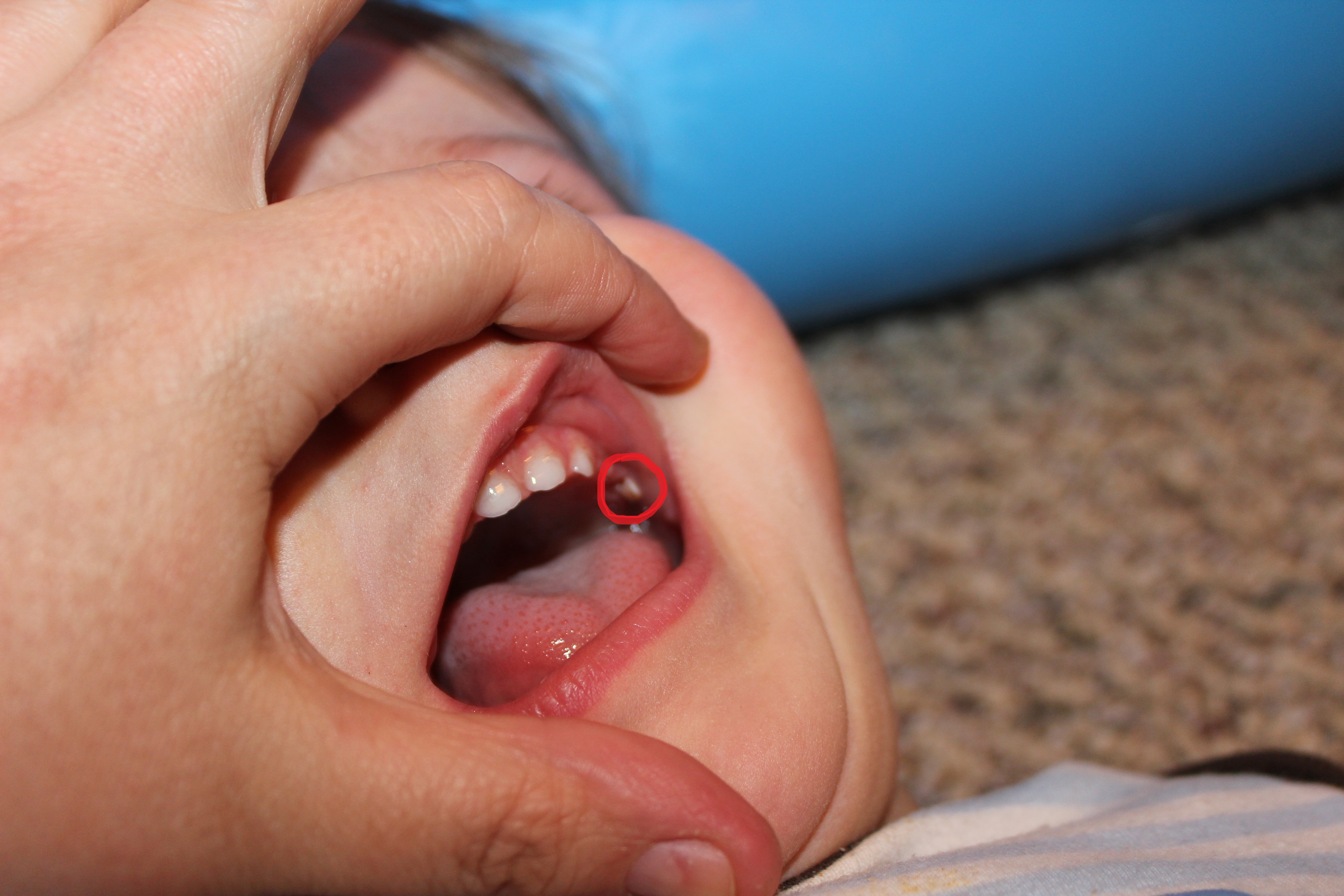
Bohn's nodule in a nine-month-old baby

Bohn’s nodules, described by Heinrich Bohn in 1886 as "mucous gland cysts", are distributed over the junction of the hard and soft palate. They are derived from minor salivary glands. They are found at the junction of the hard and soft palate, and along lingual and buccal parts of the dental ridges, away from the midline. These nodules are 1–3 mm in size, and filled with keratin. Bohn also classified cysts in the alveolar ridges as mucous gland cysts. However, a century later it was shown that these cysts are microkeratocysts.

== Adults ==
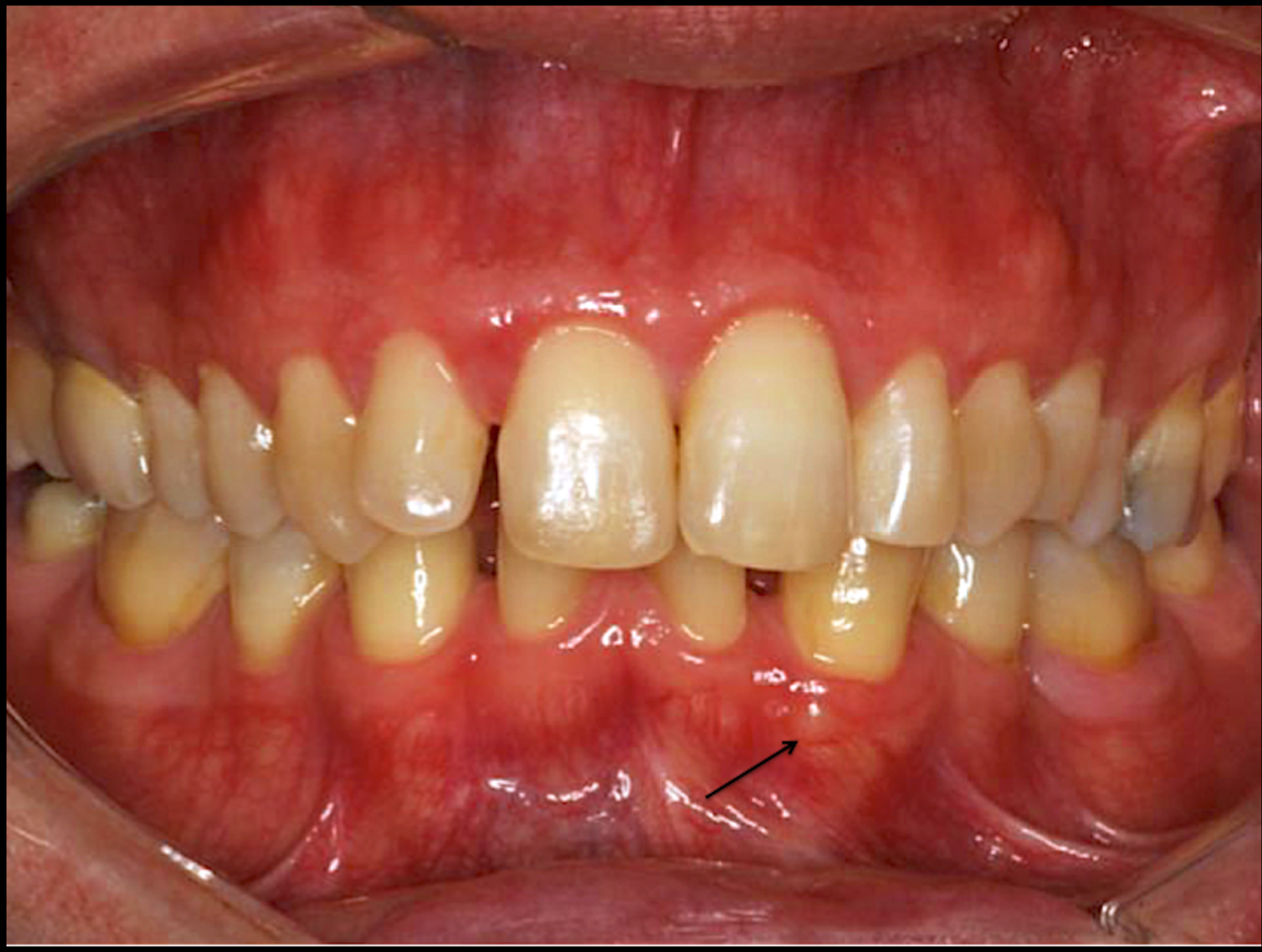
Gingival cyst of adult (arrow)

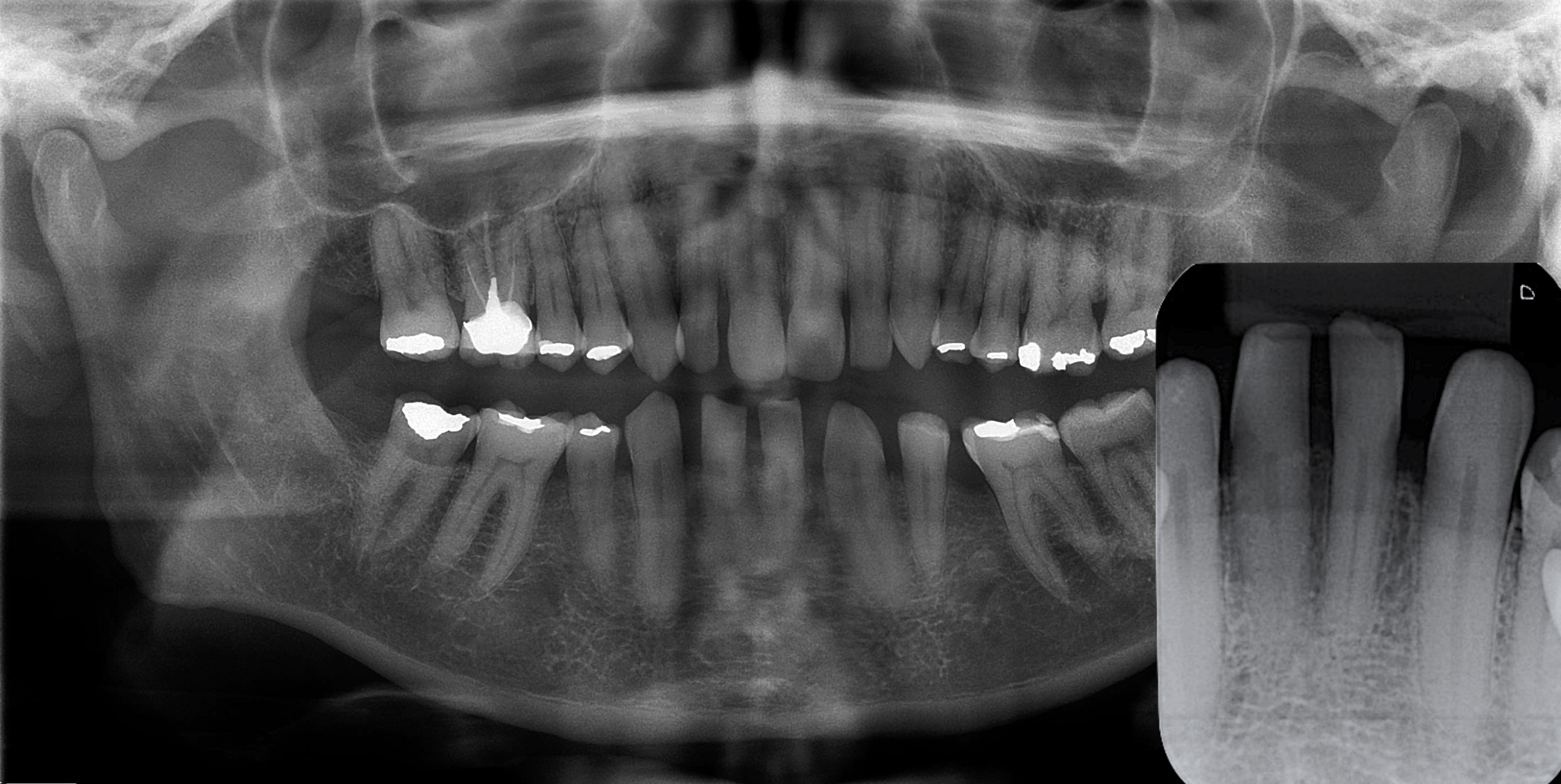
Panoramal radiograph of GCA. Inset: no evidence of bone involvement.

Gingival cyst of adult is a rare condition. The incidence is less than 0.5%. It is formed from the rests of dental lamina. It is found in the soft tissues on the buccal and labial portions of the jaw. It usually occurs on the facial gingiva as a single small flesh colored swelling, sometimes with a bluish hue due to the cystic fluid. Sometimes, it may occur in cluster, either unilaterally or bilaterally or on the lingual surface of the alveolar process. It is most commonly seen in the canine and premolar regions of the mandible, and are sometimes confused with lateral periodontal cysts. It is not normally problematic, but when it grows larger, it can cause some discomfort. It can be removed by simple surgical excision. They are developed late in life, generally up to the sixth decade of age.
