= Dentigerous cyst =

- Other names: Follicular cyst
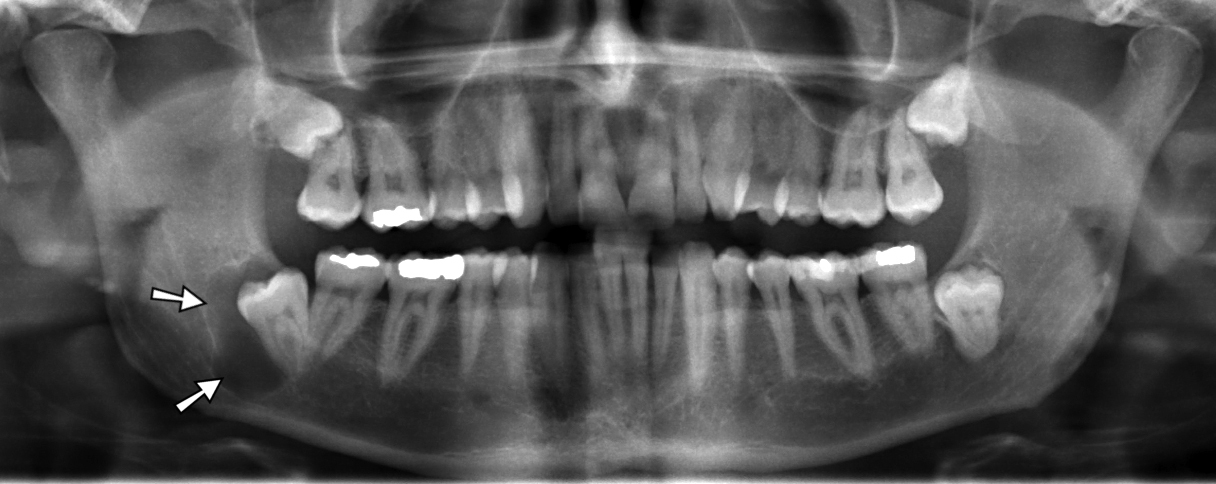
- Denigerous cyst of the right jaw around an impacted wisdom tooth
- Specialty: Dentistry

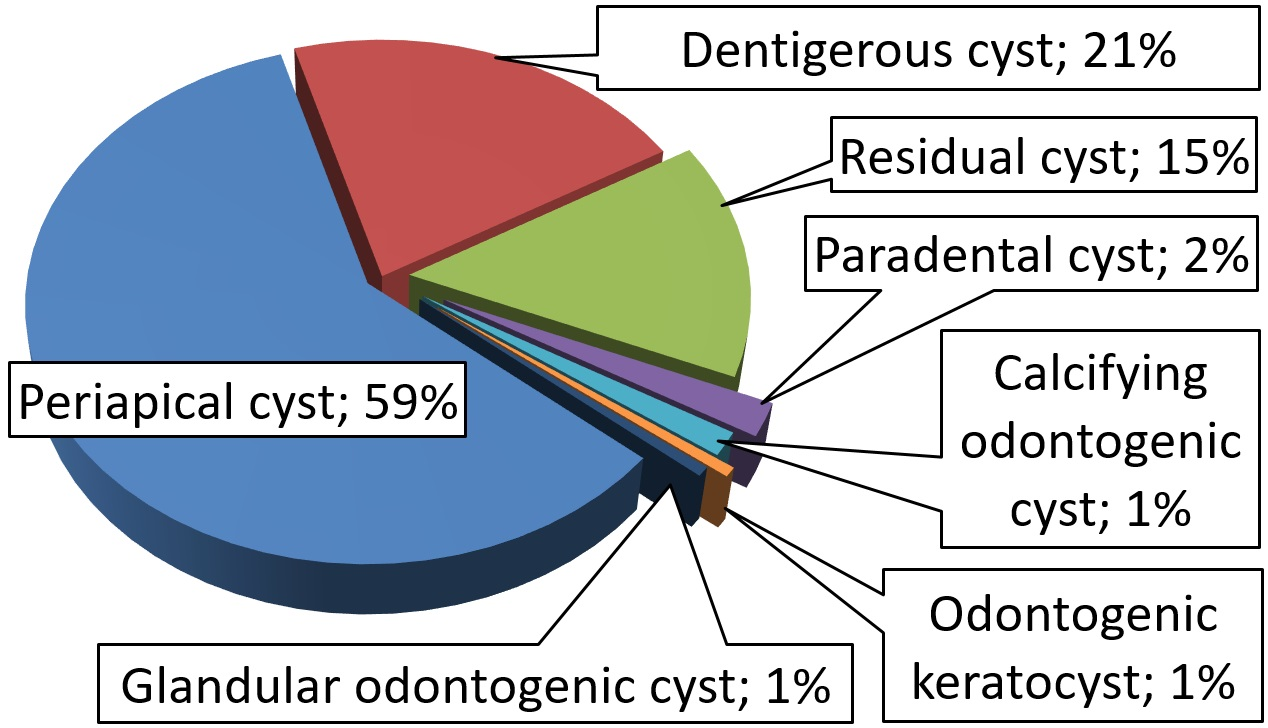
Relative incidence of odontogenic cysts. Dentigerous cyst is labeled at top right.

A dentigerous cyst, also known as a follicular cyst, is an epithelial-lined developmental cyst formed by accumulation of fluid between the reduced enamel epithelium and the crown of an unerupted tooth. It is formed when there is an alteration in the reduced enamel epithelium and encloses the crown of an unerupted tooth at the cemento-enamel junction. Fluid is accumulated between reduced enamel epithelium and the crown of an unerupted tooth.

Dentigerous cysts are the second most prevalent type of odontogenic cysts after radicular cyst. Seventy percent of the cases occur in the mandible. Dentigerous cysts are usually painless. The patient usually comes with a concern of delayed tooth eruption or facial swelling. A dentigerous cyst can go unnoticed and may be discovered coincidentally on a regular radiographic examination.

== Pathogenesis ==
Odontogenesis happens by means of a complex interaction between oral epithelium and surrounding mesenchymal tissue. Abnormal tissue interaction during this process can result in ectopic tooth development. Ectopic tooth eruption may result due to pathological process, such as a tumor or cyst or developmental disturbance. The pathogenesis of dentigerous cyst is still controversial.

The accumulation of fluid either between the reduced enamel epithelium and enamel or in between the layers of enamel organ seems to be the key to the formation of dentigerous cysts.

A potentially erupting tooth on an impacted follicle can obstruct the venous outflow, inducing rapid transudation of serum across the capillary walls.

Main suggested that this may exert pressure, causing the accumulation of fluid. On the contrary, Toiler suggested that the breakdown of proliferating cells of the follicle after impeded eruption is likely to be the origin of the dentigerous cyst. The breakdown products may result in increased osmotic tension, resulting in cyst formation.

The exact histogenesis of dentigerous cysts remains unknown, but most authors favor a developmental origin from the tooth follicle. In 1928, Bloch-Jorgensen suggested that the overlying necrotic deciduous tooth is the origin of all dentigerous cysts. The resultant periapical inflammation might spread to involve the follicle of the unerupted permanent successor, an inflammatory exudate ensued with resultant dentigerous cyst formation. He reported 22 cases of follicular cysts and stated that in each case a deciduous tooth or the remnants thereof was found in direct contact with the cyst cavity and that the related deciduous tooth always was diseased.

Azaz and Shteyer similarly suggested that the persistent and prolonged periapical inflammation caused chronic irritation to the follicle of the successors. This may trigger and hasten the formation of a dentigerous cyst developing around the permanent teeth. They reported five cases of dentigerous cysts which involved the second mandibular premolar in four children aged 8 to 11 years old. These children were referred for extraction of carious, nonvital primary molars with swelling of the surrounding soft tissue. Occlusal radiographs showed buccal expansion of bone at the affected site. The primary teeth were not in direct contact with the underlying dentigerous cyst.

It has been suggested that dentigerous cysts may be either extrafollicular or intrafollicular in origin. There were three possible mechanisms exist. Firstly, surrounding the crowns of affected teeth, the intrafollicular developmental dentigerous cysts may be formed. These cysts may be secondarily inflamed and infected as a result of periapical inflammation spreading from non vital deciduous predecessors. Benn and Altini (1996) claimed that this possibility was unlikely as all the cases reported were not associated with tooth impaction.

Secondly, radicular cysts developed at the apices of non vital primary teeth. These radicular cysts may fuse with the follicles of the unerupted successors, causing the eruption of the successors into the cyst cavity. This may result in the formation of extrafollicular dentigerous cyst. Shear regarded this to be exceptionally rare because radicular cyst is uncommon in the primary dentition.

The third possibility is that periapical inflammation could be of any source but usually from a non vital deciduous tooth spreading to involve the follicles of unerupted permanent successors. The inflammatory exudate causes separation of reduced enamel epithelium from the enamel with resultant cyst formation.

== Clinical features ==
The dentigerous cyst commonly involves a single tooth and rarely affects multiple teeth. The most frequently involved tooth is the mandibular third molar followed by the maxillary canine, but they may be associated with supernumerary or ectopic tooth. Any permanent tooth can be involved. Regezi and Sciubba stated that the impacted teeth were most commonly seen in the third molar and maxillary canine teeth, and hence dentigerous cysts occur most frequently in these teeth. The involved teeth may be displaced into ectopic positions. In the maxilla, these teeth are often displaced into the maxillary sinus. Classic symptoms of sinus disease such as headache, facial pain, purulent nasal discharge or nasolacrimal obstruction may occur when maxillary sinus is involved.

According to a study, 45.7 percent of dentigerous cysts involved mandibular third molar. On the other hand, only 2.7 percent of dentigerous cysts involved the maxillary premolar. Mourshed stated that the incidence of dentigerous cyst has been reported as 1.44 in every 100 unerupted teeth, so dentigerous cysts involving the premolars are rare.

Dentigerous cysts most commonly occur in the 2nd and 3rd decades of life. Males have been reported to be more prevalent than females with a ratio of 1.8:1. These cysts can also be found in young children and adolescents. The age of presentation of these cysts range from 3 years to 57 years with a mean of 22.5 years.

These cysts are commonly single lesions. Bilateral and multiple dentigerous cysts are very rare although they have been reported. Bilateral or multiple dentigerous cysts have been reported in Maroteaux-Lamy syndrome, cleidocranial dysplasia and Gardner's syndrome In the absence of these syndromes, the occurrence of multiple dentigerous cysts is rare. Sometimes multiple dentigerous cysts are suggested to be induced by prescribed drugs. The combined effect of cyclosporine and a calcium channel blocker is reported to cause bilateral dentigerous cyst

Dentigerous cyst is potentially capable of becoming an aggressive lesion. The possible sequelae of continuous enlargement of dentigerous cyst are expansion of the alveolar bone, displacement of teeth, severe root resorption of teeth, expansion of buccal and lingual cortex and pain.

Potential complications are development of cellulitis, deep neck infection, ameloblastoma, epidermoid carcinoma or mucoepidermoid carcinoma.

== Investigations ==
Early detection and removal of the cysts is essential to reduce morbidity since dentigerous cyst can attain considerable size without any symptoms. Patient who presents with unerupted teeth should be thoroughly examined with radiographic examinations to check our for dentigerous cysts. Panoramic radiographs may be indicated for this purpose. CT imaging becomes necessary for extensive lesion.

Pathologic analysis of the lesion is important for the definitive diagnosis even though radiographs provide valuable information.

== Histopathologic features ==
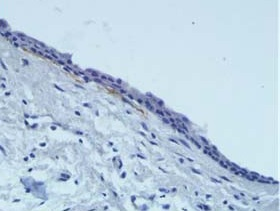
Histopathology of dentigerous cyst

The histopathologic features of dentigerous cyst are dependent on the nature of the cyst, whether it is inflamed or not inflamed.

=== Non-inflamed dentigerous cyst ===
The specimen will present with loosely arranged fibrous connective tissue wall that contains considerable glycosaminoglycan ground substance. Small islands or cords of inactive-appearing odontogenic epithelial rests are usually scattered within the connective tissue and most commonly located near the epithelial lining. These rests may appear numerous in the fibrous connective tissue wall occasionally, which may be misinterpreted as ameloblastoma by some pathologists who are unfamiliar with oral lesions. The epithelial lining is composed of two to four layers of flattened non-keratinizing cells, with a flat epithelium and connective tissue interface.

=== Inflamed dentigerous cyst ===
Occurrence of inflamed dentigerous cyst is fairly common. Histologic examination reveals a more collagenized fibrous connective tissue wall, with a variable infiltration of chronic inflammatory cells. Cholesterol slits and their associated multinucleated giant cells may be present and are generally associated with the connective tissue wall. The cyst is lined mostly or entirely by non-keratinizing squamous epithelium which display varying amounts of hyperplasia with the development of anastomosing rete ridges and more definite squamous features. Dentigerous cysts presenting with these features may histologically be indistinguishable from radicular cysts. A keratinized surface is occasionally present, which must be differentiated from those observed in the odontogenic keratocyst(OKC). Focal areas of mucous cells or rarely, ciliated columnar cells may be found in the epithelial lining of dentigerous cysts. In addition, small nests of sebaceous cells infrequently may be present within the fibrous connective tissue wall. These mucous, ciliated and sebaceous elements are postulated to represent the multipotentiality of the odontogenic epithelial lining in a dentigerous cyst.

One or several areas of nodular thickening may be seen on the luminal surface in the gross examination of the fibrous wall of a dentigerous cyst. Careful examination of these areas microscopically is mandatory to rule out the presence of early neoplastic change.

As the dental follicle surrounding the crown of an unerupted tooth usually is lined by a thin layer of reduced enamel epithelium, this may render it difficult to distinguish a small dentigerous cyst from a normal or enlarged dental follicle based on microscopic features alone.

== Imaging features ==
As the epithelial lining is derived from the reduced enamel epithelium, on radiographic examination, a dentigerous cyst appears as a unilocular radiolucent area that is associated with just the crown of an unerupted tooth and is attached to the tooth at the cementoenamel junction. Dentigerous cysts may also involve odontomas, which by their nature also have tooth crowns. The radiolucency is generally well defined and well corticated. The radiolucency often have a sclerotic border indicating bony reaction, but a secondarily infected cyst may display ill-defined borders. However, a large dentigerous cyst may give the impression of a multilocular process due to the persistence of bone trabeculae within the radiolucency.

The cyst-to-crown relationship presents several radiographic variations which are explained as follows:

Central variant
This is the most common variant which the cyst surrounds the crown of the tooth and the crown projects into the cyst.
Lateral variant
This variant is usually associated with a mesioangular impacted mandibular third molar that is partially erupted. The cyst develops laterally along the root surface and partially surrounds the crown.
Circumferential variant
The cyst surrounds the crown and extends for some distance along the root surface so that a significant portion of the root appears to lie within the cyst, as if the tooth was erupting through the centre of the cyst.

The radiographic distinction between an enlarged dental follicle and a small dentigerous cyst can be difficult and fairly arbitrary. Generally, any pericoronal radiolucency that is greater than 3–4 mm in diameter is considered suggestive of cyst formation.

Some dentigerous cysts may result in considerable displacement of the involved tooth. Infrequently, a third molar may be displaced to the lower border of the mandible or into the ascending ramus. On the other hand, maxillary anterior teeth may be displaced into the floor of the nasal cavity, while other maxillary teeth may be displaced through the maxillary sinus to the floor of the orbit. Furthermore, larger cysts can lead to resorption of adjacent unerupted teeth. Some dentigerous cysts may also grow to considerable size and produce bony expansion that is usually painless, unless secondarily infected. However, any particularly large dentigerous radiolucency should clinically be suspected of a more aggressive odontogenic lesion such as an odontogenic keratocyst or ameloblastoma. For this reason, biopsy is mandated for all significant pericoronal radiolucencies to confirm the diagnosis.

The role of CT (computerized tomography) imaging in the evaluation of cystic lesions has been well-documented. CT imaging aids to rule out solid and fibro-osseous lesions, displays bony detail, and provides precise information about the size, origin, content, and relationships of the lesions.

On CT imaging, a mandibular dentigerous cyst appears as a well-circumscribed unilocular area of osteolysis that incorporates the crown of a tooth. Displacement of adjacent teeth may be seen and they may be partly eroded. Dentigerous cysts in the maxilla often extend into the antrum, displacing and remodeling the bony sinus wall. Large cysts which may project into the nasal cavity or infratemporal fossa and may elevate the floor of the orbit can be noted on CT imaging. In the mandible, buccal or lingual cortical expansion and thinning are noted.

On MR imaging, the contents of the cyst display low to intermediate signal intensity on T1-weighted images and high signal intensity on T2-weighted images. The tooth itself is a zone of signal void. The lining of the cyst is thin with regular thickness and may show slight enhancement after contrast injection.

== Treatment and prognosis ==
The treatment of choice for dentigerous cyst is enucleation along with extraction of the impacted teeth. If eruption of the unerupted tooth is considered feasible, the tooth may be left in place after partial removal of the cyst wall. Orthodontic treatment may subsequently be required to assist eruption. Similarly, if displacement of the associated tooth by the cyst has occurred and extraction may prove to be difficult, orthodontic movement of the tooth to a more advantageous location for extraction may be accomplished. Marsupialization may also be used to treat large dentigerous cysts. This permits the decompression of the cyst, with a resulting decrease in the size of the bone defect. The cyst can then be excised at a later date, with a less extensive surgical procedure.

The prognosis for the dentigerous cyst is excellent, and recurrence is rare. This is related to the exhausted nature of the reduced enamel epithelium, which has differentiated and formed tooth crown enamel before developing into a cyst. Nevertheless, several potential complications must be considered. The possibility that the lining of a dentigerous cyst might undergo neoplastic transformation to an ameloblastoma has been well-documented. Mourshed showed that 33% of ameloblastomas arose from the epithelial lining of a dentigerous cyst. Although undeniably this can occur, the frequency of such neoplastic transformation is low. In addition, a squamous cell carcinoma may rarely arise in the lining of a dentigerous cyst. Transformation from normal epithelial cyst lining to SCC is due to chronic inflammation. It is likely that some intraosseous mucoepidermoid carcinomas develop from mucous cells in the lining of a dentigerous cyst. Malignancy in the cyst wall is usually unexpected at the time of presentation and the diagnosis is usually made following enucleation. Jagged or irregular margins with indentations and indistinct borders are considered to be suggestive of possible malignant change. Due to the potential for occurrence of an odontogenic keratocyst or the development of an ameloblastoma or, more rarely, mucoepidermoid carcinoma, all such lesions, when excised, should be submitted for histopathologic evaluation.

== Differential diagnosis ==
The differential diagnoses of dentigerous cysts are as follows:

Radicular cyst
An odontogenic cyst that is a sequela of periapical granuloma in a carious tooth.
Odontogenic keratocyst (OKC)
This is often multilocular and most commonly located in the body or the ramus of the mandible.
Histologically, the epithelium is uniform in nature, usually four to eight cells in thickness. The basilar layer consists of a palisaded row of cuboidal to columnar cells that may demonstrate hyperchromatism. Characteristically, a corrugated or wavy layer of parakeratin is produced on the epithelial surface and desquamated keratin may be present in the cyst lumen.
Odontogenic keratocysts do not result in the same degree of bony expansion as dentigerous cysts and teeth resorption are less likely to be seen in association with odontogenic keratocysts. In addition, dentigerous cysts are more likely to have smooth periphery and odontogenic keratocysts are more likely to display a scalloped periphery.
Unicystic ameloblastoma
The most common radiolucent, benign odontogenic tumor, which may be unilocular or multilocular. It may result in expansion and destruction of the maxilla and mandible. It is not possible to differentiate unicystic ameloblastomas from dentigerous cysts with clinical and radiographic examinations.
Histopathologic examination revealed that the basilar cells in unicystic ameloblastoma become columnar and demonstrate prominent nuclear hyperchromatism. The polarization of nuclei may be away from the basement membrane (reverse polarization). Besides, the superficial epithelial layers may become loosely arranged and resemble the stellate reticulum of the enamel organ.
Pindborg tumor
A rare odontogenic tumor that is radiolucent with well-defined border and associated calcified radiopaque foci.
Adenomatoid odontogenic tumor
Also shows similar features as dentigerous cyst; however, the differentiation is by the presence of intra-cystic radio-opaque structures. In younger patients, the periapical radiolucencies associated with deciduous teeth may mimic pericoronal radiolucencies of succedaneous permanent teeth and may result in a false impression of dentigerous cyst. A definitive diagnosis will not be made based on radiographs alone. The diagnosis can only be confirmed by histopathological examination.
Odontoma
A lytic lesion that is frequently accompanied by amorphous calcification.
Odontogenic fibromyxoma
Usually has multiple radiolucent areas of varying size and bony septations, but unilocular lesions have also been described.
Cementoma
A lytic lesion that is most often seen with amorphous calcification.

== See also ==
- Teratoma, a type of tumor in which tooth tissue occasionally grows in ectopic places
