= Marsupialization =

Surgical technique for cysts and abscesses

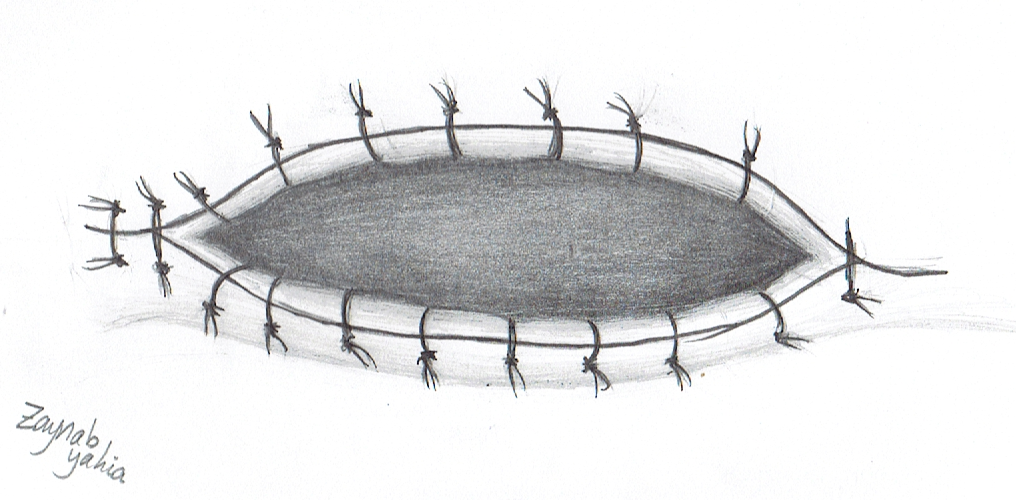
Marsupialization

Marsupialization is the surgical technique of cutting a slit into an abscess or cyst and suturing the edges of the slit to form a continuous surface from the exterior surface to the interior surface of the cyst or abscess. Sutured in this fashion, the site remains open and can drain freely. This technique is used to treat a cyst or abscess when a single draining would not be effective and complete removal of the surrounding structure would not be desirable. The technique is often applied to Gartner's duct cysts, pancreatic cysts, pilonidal cysts, and Bartholin's cysts.

In the case of a dentigerous cyst, marsupialization may be performed to allow the growing tooth associated with the cyst to continue eruption into the oral cavity. It is also in use in dacryocystorhinostomy surgery in which the lacrimal sac mucosa is connected to the nasal mucosa above the level of the mechanical obstruction at the nasolacrimal duct.
