= Adenomatoid odontogenic tumor =

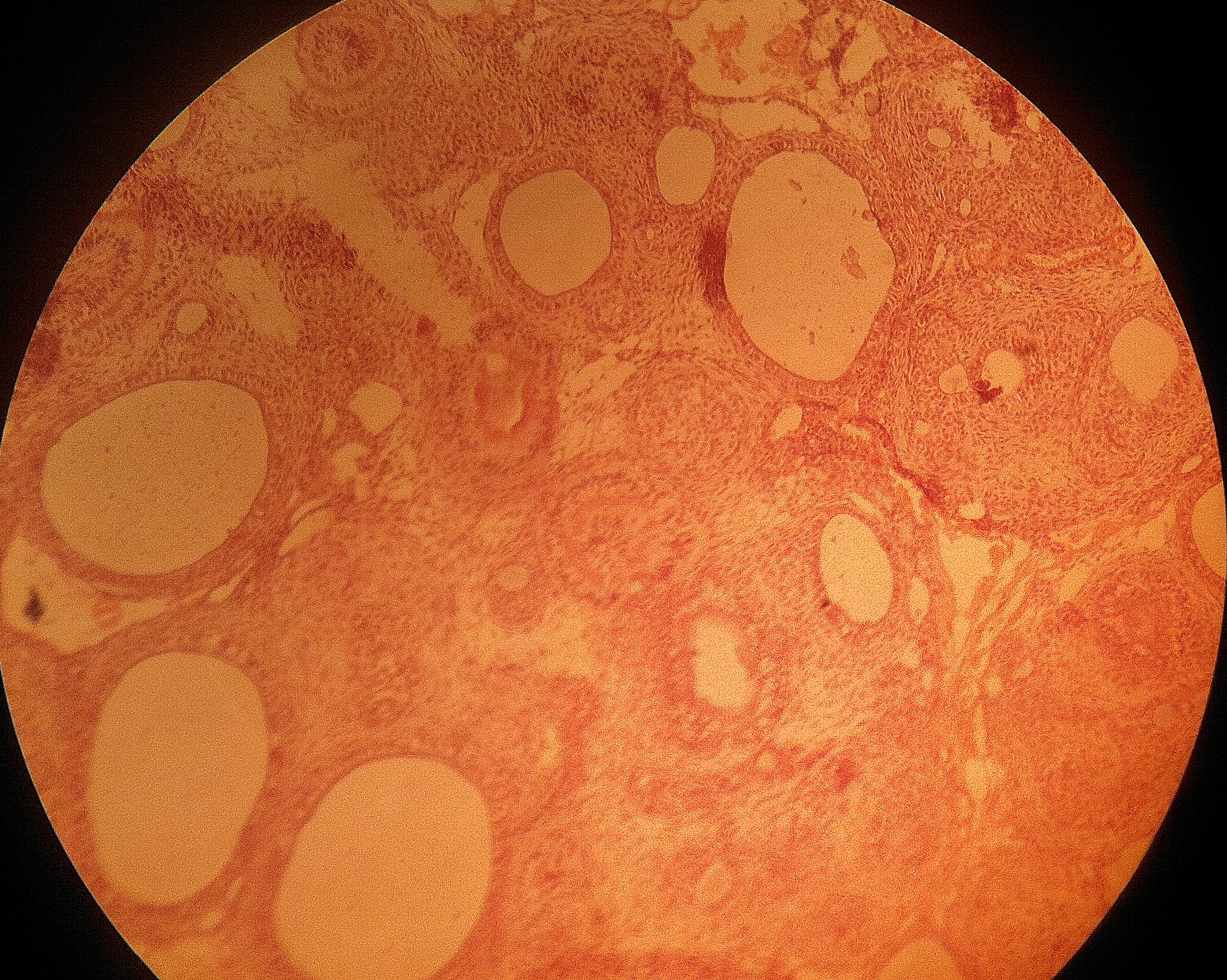
- Specialty: Dentistry

The adenomatoid odontogenic tumor is an odontogenic tumor arising from the enamel organ or dental lamina.

== Signs and symptoms ==
Adenomatoid odontogenic tumors are more prevalent in females, in the second decade of life, in maxillae, in anterior region of the jaws, and most cases are asymptomatic, although a considerable number of cases present cortical bone perforation. Two thirds of cases are located in the anterior maxilla, and one third are present in the anterior mandible. Almost 70% of the cases are associated with an impacted canine.

== Diagnosis ==
On radiographs, the adenomatoid odontogenic tumor presents as a radiolucency (dark area) around an unerupted tooth extending past the cementoenamel junction.

It should be differentially diagnosed from a dentigerous cyst and the main difference is that the radiolucency in case of AOT extends apically beyond the cementoenamel junction.

Radiographs will exhibit faint flecks of radiopacities surrounded by a radiolucent zone.

It is sometimes misdiagnosed as a cyst.

== Treatment ==
Most of the cases are treated by enucleation. Recurrence is very rare, with only one case of recurrence being well documented in the literature.

== Epidemiology ==
It is fairly uncommon, but it is seen more in young people. Two thirds of the cases are found in females.
