= Nasopalatine duct cyst =

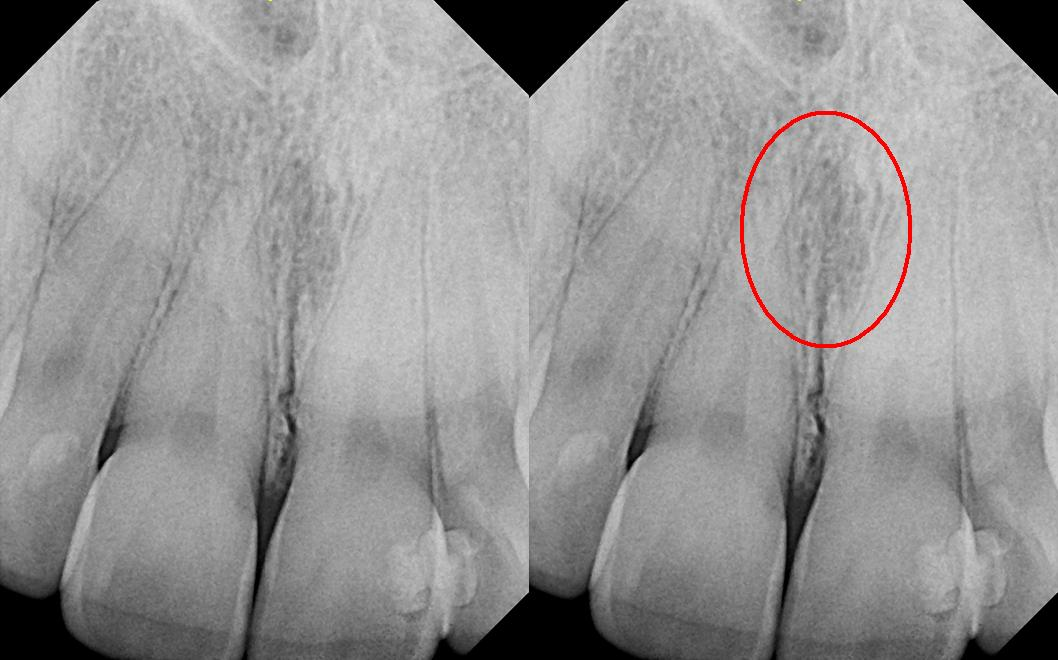
- Identical images with heart-shaped radiolucency highlighted in right film
- Specialty: Oral and maxillofacial surgery

The nasopalatine duct cyst (NPDC) occurs in the median of the palate, usually anterior to first molars. It often appears between the roots of the maxillary central incisors. Radiographically, it may often appear as a heart-shaped radiolucency. It is usually asymptomatic, but may sometimes produce an elevation in the anterior portion of the palate. It was first described by Meyer in 1914.

The median palatal cyst has recently been identified as a possible posterior version of the nasopalatine duct cyst.

== Signs and symptoms ==
Nasopalatine duct cysts usually present as asymptomatic palatal swellings, but they may rarely be accompanied by pain and/or purulent discharge.

== Cause and diagnosis ==
Historically, the cause of nasopalatine duct cysts has been somewhat of an enigma. Although it was originally postulated that the cyst formed from trapped epithelial cells during embryonic fusion of the palatal bones, it is now thought that it forms from oronasal ducts present within the incisive canals.

As a cyst, the nasopalatine duct cyst requires histological analysis for a definitive diagnosis. Radiographically, the nasopalatine cyst appears as a well-demarcated round, ovoid, or heart-shaped structure presenting in the midline of the maxilla.

== Treatment ==
The cysts are generally treated by excision.

== Epidemiology ==
The nasopalatine cyst is the most common non-odontogenic cyst of the oral cavity, at an estimated occurrence rate of 1 %.
