= Median mandibular cyst =

Type of growth on the mandible

A median mandibular cyst is a type of cyst that occurs in the midline of the mandible, thought to be created by proliferation and cystic degeneration of resting epithelial tissue that is left trapped within the substance of the bone during embryologic fusion of the two halves of the mandible, along the plane of fusion later termed the symphysis menti. A true median mandibular cyst would therefore be classified as a non-odontogenic, fissural cyst. The existence of this lesion as a unique clinical entity is controversial, and some reported cases may have represented misdiagnosed odontogenic cysts, which are by far the most common type of intrabony cyst occurring in the jaws. It has also been suggested that the mandible develops as a bilobed proliferation of mesenchyme connected with a central isthmus. Therefore, it is unlikely that epithelial tissue would become trapped as there is no ectoderm separating the lobes in the first instance.
