= Ameloblastoma =

Tumor made of enamel-producing cells (ameloblasts) in developing teeth

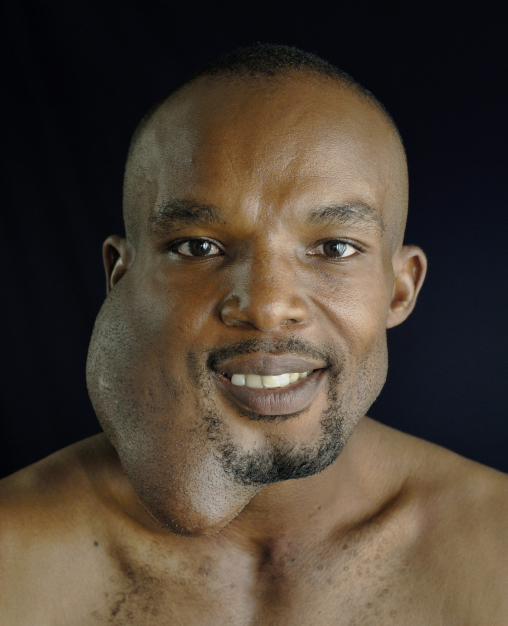
- Ameloblastoma of the mandible
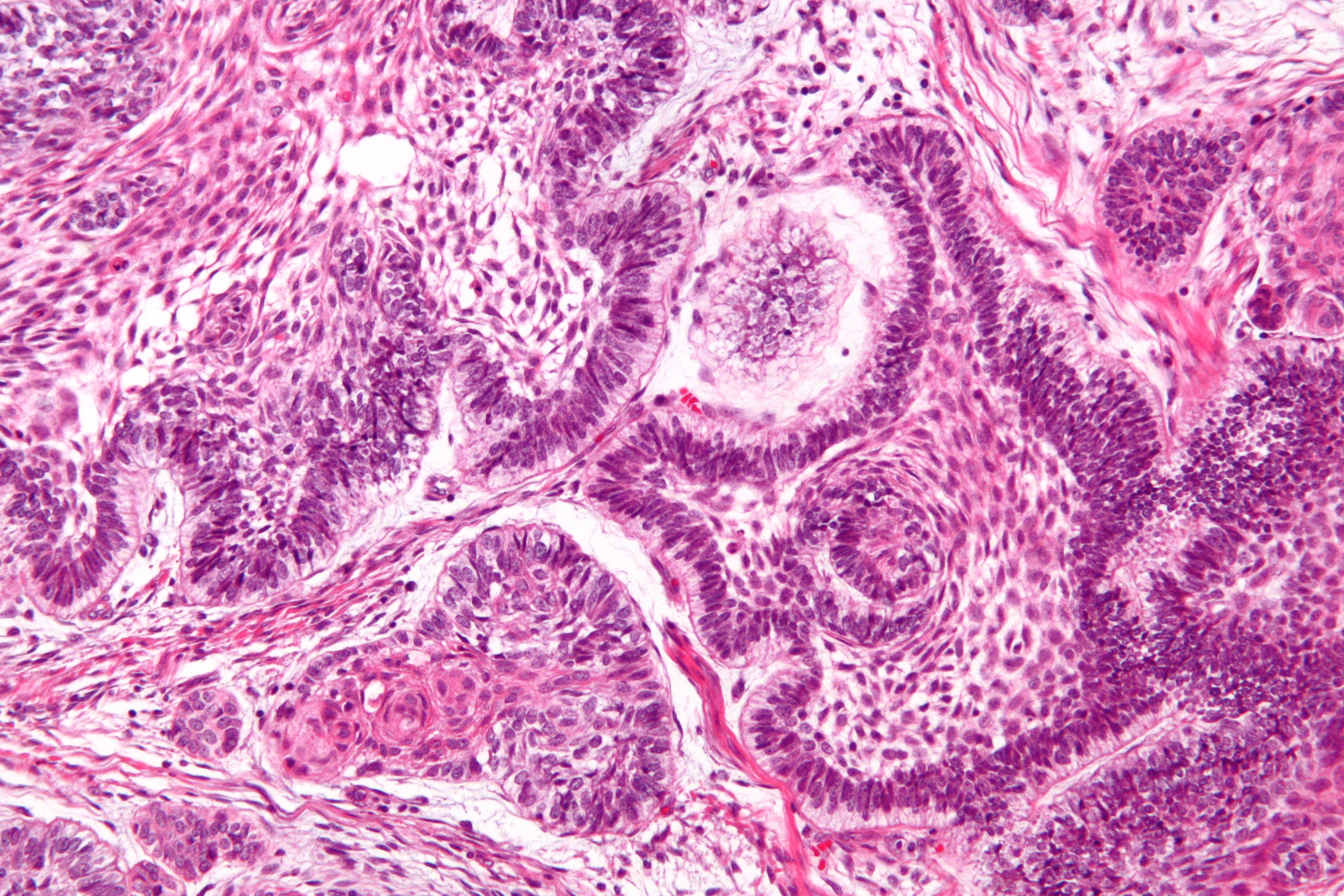
- Micrograph of an ameloblastoma showing the characteristic palisading and stellate reticulum. H&E stain.
- Specialty: Oncology, oral and maxillofacial surgery

Ameloblastoma is a rare, benign or cancerous tumor of odontogenic epithelium (ameloblasts, or outside portion, of the teeth during development) much more commonly appearing in the lower jaw than the upper jaw. It was recognized in 1827 by Cusack. This type of odontogenic neoplasm was designated as an adamantinoma in 1885 by the French physician Louis-Charles Malassez. It was finally renamed to the modern name ameloblastoma in 1930 by Ivey and Churchill.

While these tumors are rarely malignant or metastatic (that is, they rarely spread to other parts of the body), and progress slowly, the resulting lesions can cause severe abnormalities of the face and jaw leading to severe disfiguration. Additionally, as abnormal cell growth easily infiltrates and destroys surrounding bony tissues, wide surgical excision is required to treat this disorder. If an aggressive tumor is left untreated, it can obstruct the nasal and oral airways making it impossible to breathe without oropharyngeal intervention. The term "ameloblastoma" is from Old English amel 'enamel' and Greek blastos 'germ'.

== Types ==
Four types of ameloblastoma have been described by the WHO 2017 classification:

- Conventional (solid/multicystic) type ameloblastoma
- Unicystic ameloblastoma
- Peripheral/extraosseous ameloblastoma
- Metastasizing ameloblastoma

=== Conventional ameloblastoma ===
Previously known as solid/multicystic ameloblastoma. Usually presents with multiple large cystic areas.

=== Unicystic ameloblastoma ===
Ameloblastoma with a single cyst cavity account for around 10% of ameloblastomas. Present in younger patients in their second and third decades of life, often in relation to unerupted third molar.

=== Metastasising ameloblastoma ===
Histologically atypical ameloblastoma can, rarely, lead to metastasis, usually in the lung. 'Metastasis' look histologically identical to the primary tumour and are benign in nature.

=== Peripheral ameloblastoma ===
The peripheral subtype composes 2% of all ameloblastomas.

== Presentation ==
Ameloblastomas can be found both in the maxilla and mandible, although 80% are situated in the mandible, with the posterior ramus area being the most frequent site. The neoplasms are often associated with the presence of unerupted teeth, displacement of adjacent teeth and resorption of roots.

Symptoms include a slow-growing, painless swelling leading to facial deformity. As the swelling gets progressively larger it can impinge on other structures resulting in loose teeth and malocclusion. Bone can also be perforated leading to soft tissue involvement.

The lesion has a tendency to expand the bony cortices because the slow growth rate of the lesion allows time for the periosteum to develop a thin shell of bone ahead of the expanding lesion. This shell of bone cracks when palpated. This phenomenon is referred to as "Egg Shell Cracking" or crepitus, an important diagnostic feature.

Maxillary ameloblastomas can be dangerous and even lethal. Due to thin bone and weak barriers, the neoplasm can extend into the sinonasal passages, pterygomaxillary fossa and eventually into the cranium and brain. Rare orbital invasion of the neoplasm has also been reported.

== Histopathology ==
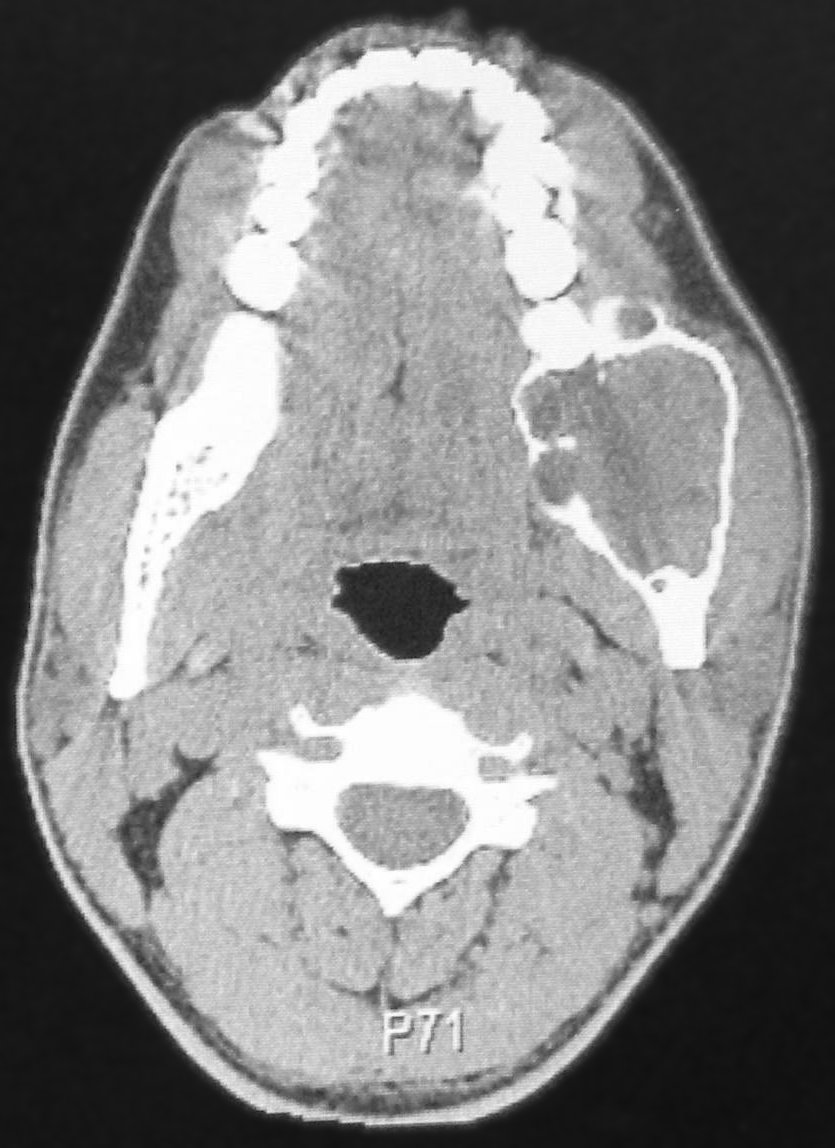
A CT scan of a patient with an ameloblastoma.

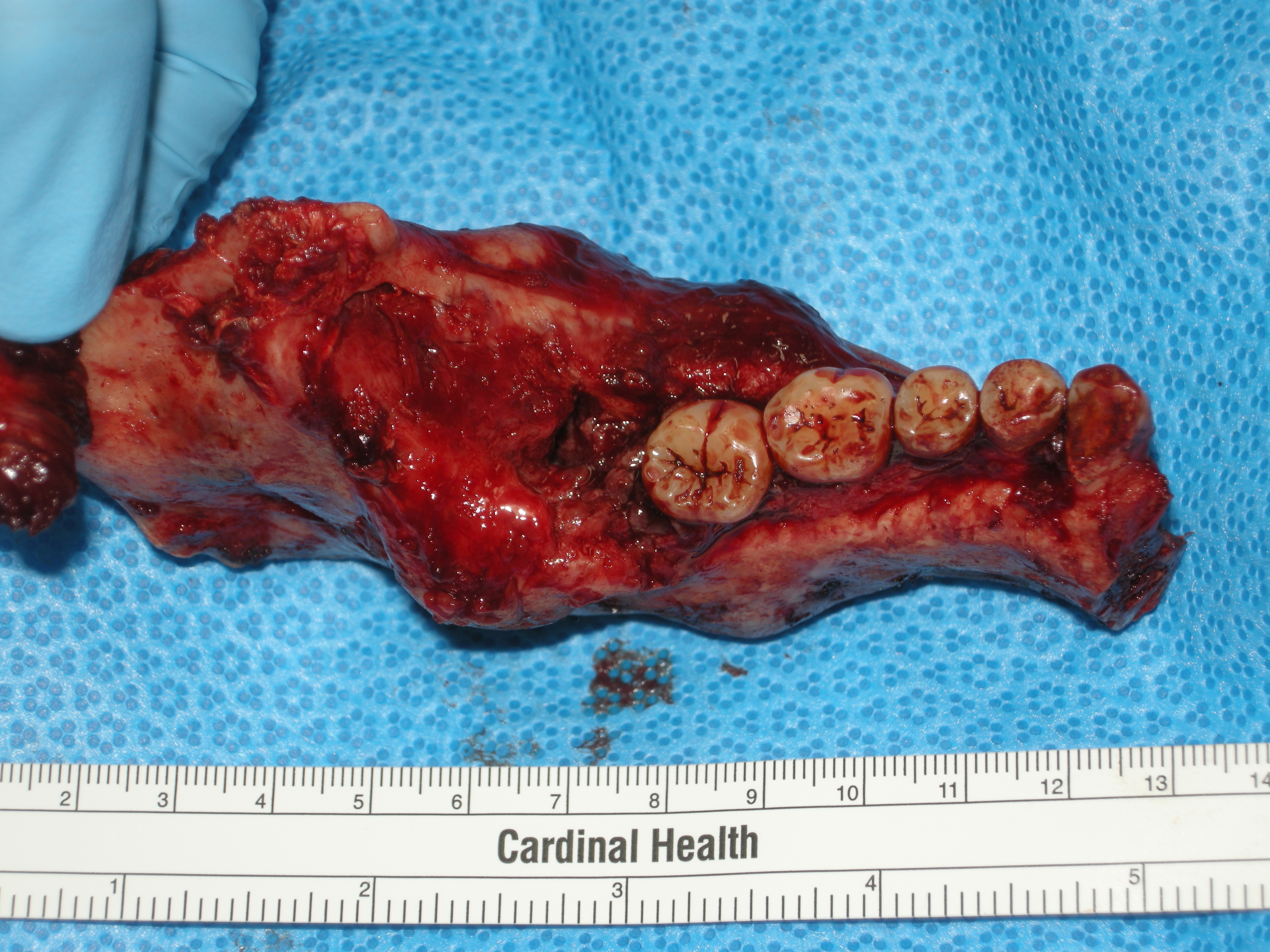
The resected left half of a mandible containing an ameloblastoma, initiated at the third molar

Conventional ameloblastomas have both cystic and solid neoplastic structures.

=== Solid structure ===
Solid areas contain fibrous tissue islands or epithelium that interconnect through strands and sheets. The epithelial cells tend to move the nucleus away from the basement membrane to the opposite pole of the cell. This process is called reverse polarization. Two main histological patterns most often occur: follicular and plexiform. Other less common histological variants include acanthomatous, basal cell, and granular cell patterns.

==== Follicular ====
The most common follicular type has an outer arrangement of columnar or palisaded ameloblasts-like cells and inner zone of triangular shaped cells resembling stellate reticulum from the bell stage of tooth development.

==== Plexiform ====
The plexiform type has epithelium that proliferates in a "Fish Net Pattern". The plexiform ameloblastoma shows epithelium proliferating in a 'cord like fashion', hence the name 'plexiform'. There are layers of cells in between the proliferating epithelium with well-formed desmosomal junctions, simulating spindle cell layers. The ameloblasts cells can be less prominent.

=== Cystic structure ===
Large cysts up to a few centimetres in diameter can be found. In follicular type, cysts develop in the stellate reticulum and in the plexiform type, cysts are caused by degeneration of connective tissue stroma.

=== Desmoplastic ameloblastoma ===
A distinctive histological variant of conventional ameloblastoma. Found in near equal frequencies in both maxilla and mandible. Resemble a fibro-osseous lesion with no obvious ameloblasts whilst dominated by dense collagenous tissue (desmoplastic). In one center, desmoplastic ameloblastomas represented about 9% of all ameloblastomas encountered. A systematic review showed a predilection for males and predominance in fourth and fifth decades in life. 52% of the cases of desmoplastic ameloblastomas showed mandibular involvement, with a tendency to anterior region. The majority of the tumors were found to have ill-defined margins radiographically.

== Diagnosis ==
Ameloblastoma is tentatively diagnosed through radiographic examination and must be confirmed by histological examination through biopsy.

Radiographically, the tumour area appears as a rounded and well-defined lucency in the bone with varying size and features. Numerous cyst-like radiolucent areas can be seen in larger tumours (multi-locular) giving a characteristic "soap bubble" appearance. A single radiolucent area can be seen in smaller tumours (unilocular). The radiodensity of an ameloblastoma is about 30 Hounsfield units, which is about the same as keratocystic odontogenic tumours. However, ameloblastomas show more bone expansion and seldom show high density areas.

Lingual plate expansion is helpful in diagnosing ameloblastoma as cysts rarely do this. Resorption of roots of involved teeth can be seen in some cases, but is not unique to ameloblastoma.

=== Differential diagnosis ===
- Keratocystic odontogenic tumour
- Central giant-cell granuloma
- Odontogenic myxoma

== Treatment ==
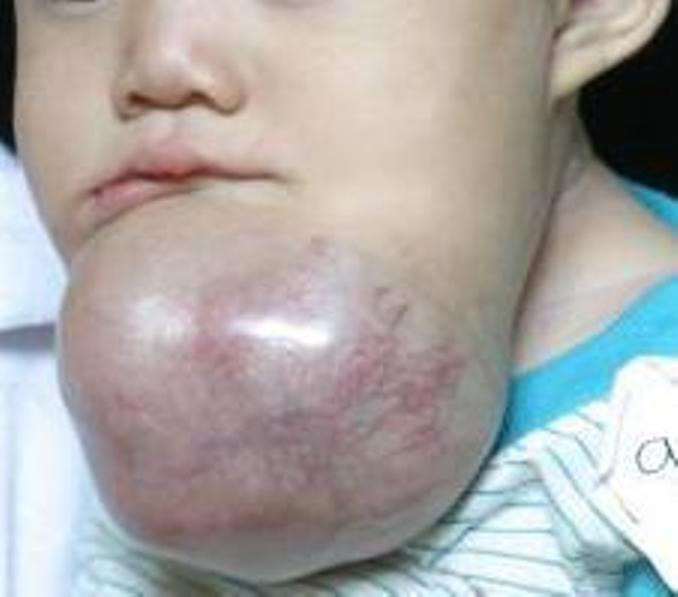
Tracheal intubation is difficult in this child with a large ameloblastoma.

Chemotherapy, radiation therapy, curettage, and liquid nitrogen have been effective in only very rare cases of ameloblastoma, so surgical resection or enucleation are the recommended treatment options. In a detailed study of 345 patients, chemotherapy and radiation therapy were contraindicated for the treatment of ameloblastomas. Thus, surgery is the most common treatment of ameloblastomas. A case of giant ameloblastoma was reported in 2022 and managed with total mandibulectomy and pectoralis major myocutaneous flap reconstruction. A systematic review found that 79% of desmoplastic ameloblastoma cases were treated by resection. Conservative treatment requires very careful case selection.

=== Surgical resection ===
Treatment and surgery aim to remove the entire tumour with a margin of surrounding tissue (block resection) for a good prognosis. Preferable, removal includes 10mm of normal bone around the neoplasm. Larger ameloblastomas can require partial resection of the jawbone followed by bone grafting. There is evidence that the treatment of conventional ameloblastoma is best done by bone resection. A systematic review found that 79% of desmoplastic ameloblastoma cases were treated by resection. Enucleation with an additional therapy (either curettage or peripheral osteotomy) or resection leads to a lower recurrence risk of desmoplastic ameloblastomas in comparison to curettage or enucleation without additional therapy.

=== Enucleation ===
Smaller mandibular neoplasms have been enucleated where the cavity of the tumour is curetted, allowing preservation of the bone cortex and the lower border of the mandible. Although, recurrence rate for this type of treatment is higher. Unicystic ameloblastomas—called intraluminal unicystic or plexiform unicystic ameloblastomas can be enucleated, as the epithelium is only limited to the inner cyst wall and lumen.

=== Radiation and chemotherapy ===
Radiation is ineffective in many cases of ameloblastoma. There have also been reports of sarcoma being induced as a result of using radiation to treat ameloblastoma. Chemotherapy is also often ineffective. However, there is some controversy regarding this and some indication that some ameloblastomas might be more responsive to radiation than previously thought.

=== Follow-up and recurrence ===
Persistent follow-up examination, including radiographs, is essential for managing ameloblastoma. Follow-up should occur at regular intervals for at least 10 years. Follow up is important, because 50% of all recurrences occur within 5 years postoperatively.

Recurrence is common, although the recurrence rates for block resection followed by bone graft are lower than those of enucleation and curettage. Follicular variants appear to recur more than plexiform variants. Unicystic lesions recur less frequently than "non-unicystic" lesions. A low recurrence rate of around 10% can be seen in unicystic ameloblastomas. Recurrence within a bone graft (following resection of the original tumor) does occur, but is less common. Seeding to the bone graft is suspected as a cause of recurrence. The recurrences in these cases seem to stem from the soft tissues, especially the adjacent periosteum. Recurrence has been reported to occur as many as 36 years after treatment. To reduce the likelihood of recurrence within grafted bone, meticulous surgery with attention to the adjacent soft tissues is required.

=== Molecular biology ===
BRAF V600E gene and SMO gene mutations have been found in ameloblastomas. The V600E mutation is also seen in other malignant and benign neoplasms, which activate the mitogen-activated protein kinase pathway required for cell division and differentiation, but it is the most commonly seen mutation in ameloblastoma. 72% of BRAF mutations are found in the mandible. A recent study discovered a high frequency of BRAF V600E mutations (15 of 24 samples, 63%) in conventional ameloblastoma. These data suggest that drugs targeting mutant BRAF are potential novel therapies for ameloblastoma.

SMO mutations activate the hedgehog signaling pathway, yielding results similar to V600E, but are less frequently seen. 55% of SMO mutations are found in the maxilla.

Evidence shows that suppression of matrix metalloproteinase-2 may inhibit the local invasiveness of ameloblastoma; however, this was demonstrated in vitro. There is also some research suggesting that α_{5}β_{1} integrin may participate in the local invasiveness of ameloblastomas.

== Epidemiology ==
People with African heritage have been shown to have a higher incidence compared to Caucasians, with the site often being in the midline of the mandible. The annual incidence rates per million for ameloblastomas are 1.96, 1.20, 0.18 and 0.44 for black males, black females, white males and white females respectively. Ameloblastomas account for about one percent of all oral tumors and about 18% of odontogenic tumors. Men and women are equally affected, though women average four years younger than men when tumors first occur, and tumors run larger in females.

== See also ==
- Ameloblastic fibroma
- Ameloblastic fibro-odontoma
- Bone grafting
- Epithelial cell rests of Malassez
- List of cutaneous conditions
- Matrix Metalloproteinase-2
- Tooth development and Odontogenesis
