= Enucleation (medicine) =

Surgical removal of a mass without dissection

As a general surgical technique, enucleation refers to the surgical removal of a mass without cutting into or dissecting it.

== Removal of the eye ==
Enucleation refers to the removal of the eyeball itself, while leaving surrounding tissues intact.

== Removal of oral cysts and tumors ==
In the context of oral pathology, enucleation involves surgical removal of all tissue (both hard and soft) involved in a lesion.

== Removal of uterine fibroids (leiomyomata) ==
Enucleation is the removal of fibroids without removing the uterus (hysterectomy), which is also commonly performed.
