= Mixed odontogenic tumor =

Mixed odontogenic tumor may refer to:

- Ameloblastic fibroma
- Ameloblastic fibro-odontoma
- Odontoma
