= Ameloblastic fibroma =

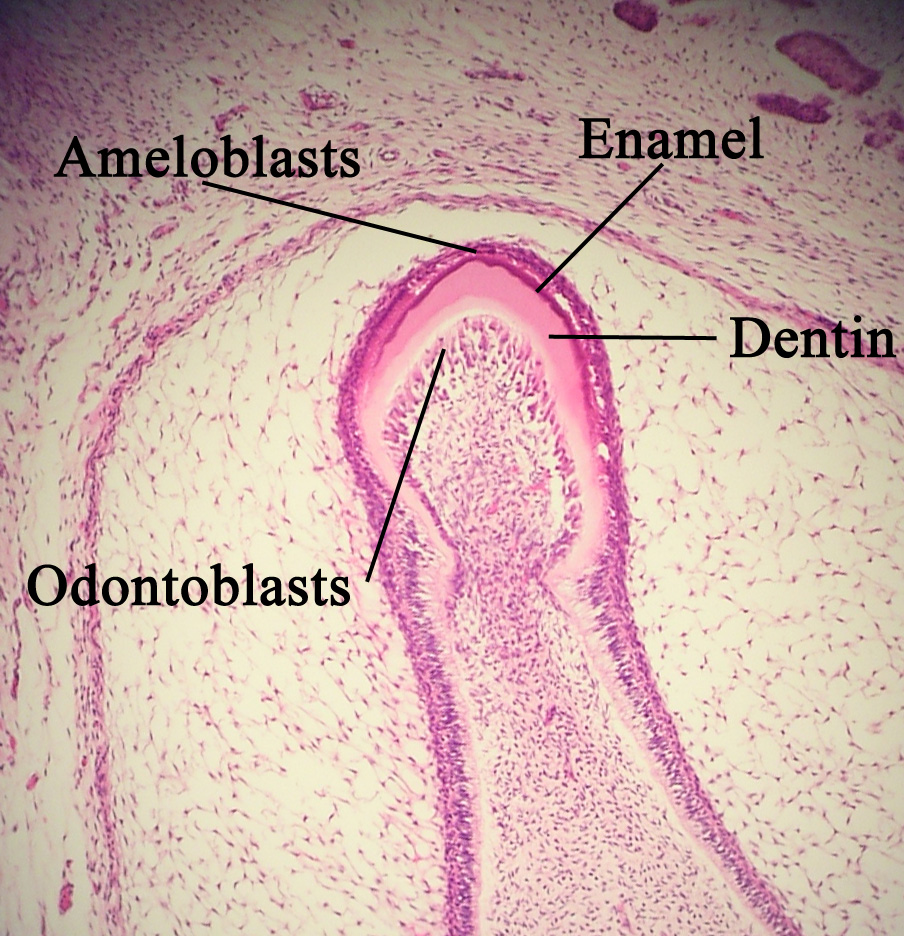
- Histology of developing tooth with enamel, dentin, ameloblasts, and odontoblasts labeled. Tooth bud is in maturation/crown stage.
- Symptoms: Painless swelling of the jaw.
- Complications: Impacted tooth.
- Usual onset: Childhood or adolescence.
- Diagnostic method: Dental radiograph.
- Differential diagnosis: Ameloblastic fibro-odontoma or odontoma.
- Treatment: Surgical excision or curettage and removal of the effected teeth.
- Frequency: 2% of odontogenic tumors.

An ameloblastic fibroma is a fibroma of the ameloblastic tissue, that is, an odontogenic tumor arising from the enamel organ or dental lamina. It may be either truly neoplastic or merely hamartomatous (an odontoma). In neoplastic cases, it may be labeled an ameloblastic fibrosarcoma in accord with the terminological distinction that reserves the word fibroma for benign tumors and assigns the word fibrosarcoma to malignant ones. It is more common in the first and second decades of life, when odontogenesis is ongoing, than in later decades. In 50% of cases an unerupted tooth is involved.

Histopathology alone is usually not enough to differentiate neoplastic cases from hamartomatous ones, because the histology is very similar. Other clinical and radiographic clues are used to narrow the diagnosis.

== Clinical Features ==
Ameloblastic fibroma is a rare benign mixed epithelial and mesenchymal odontogenic tumour as it contributes to approximately 2% of all odontogenic tumours. It often occurs in the first or second decade of life. Ameloblastic fibroma usually appears as painless swelling of the jaw in the posterior region of the mandible. It can be associated with an impacted tooth and it might impede eruption of other teeth. The lesion can be asymptomatic when it is small and most are incidental findings of routine dental radiographic imaging, etc.

== Diagnosis ==
=== Radiographic Features ===
Radiographically, ameloblastic fibroma has a variable appearance. It can appear as a unilocular lesion with smooth, well-defined margin when smaller. However, it can be multilocular when it is enlarged. It can be mistaken as dentigerous cyst as the lesion is often associated with an impacted tooth.

=== Histopathology ===
The histopathology of ameloblastic fibromas resembles the stages of normal tooth development. These mixed lesions consist of histologically distinct epithelial and mesenchymal tissues. The epithelial tissue resembles dental lamina and enamel organ tissues, while the mesenchyme resembles the dental papilla.

The epithelial component features strands which branch and join, or anastomose. This results in knots of differing mass, resembling islands in a loose stroma. Cells in the strands tend to be cuboidal, but where budding occurs from the strands the knots resemble tooth caps. The bud-cap stage of normal development shows ameloblasts forming palisades of columnar cells adjacent to a starry-like, loosely formed layer known as stellate reticulum. However, the pattern of budding strands is distinctive from normal development. The Ameloblastic Fibroma epithelial tissue could be confused with the most common odontogenic tumour, the Ameloblastoma. Therefore the mesenchymal component is histologically important in differential diagnosis.

The mesenchymal stroma in normal development is a rich myxoid connective tissue. It gives rise to the dental follicle which encapsulates the developing tooth. In Ameloblastoma the stroma is mature, often fibrous. This is distinct from the mesenchymal element of Ameloblastic Fibroma which is devoid of collagen. The Ameloblastic Fibroma stroma remains primitive, undifferentiated, cell-rich and myxoid. Rarely, it may contain granular cells. However, this may also be observed in a hyperplastic dental follicle, and therefore other histological and radiological diagnostic features should be observed.

The malignant ameloblastic fibroma will have features of malignant transformation such as mitotic figures in either epithelial or mesenchymal tissue. There is a resemblance to fibrosarcoma. The malignant Ameloblastic Fibroma histologically shows transformation in the mesenchymal component with increased cellularity, accompanied by a progressive reduction in epithelial tissue.

=== Classification ===
An ameloblastic fibroma is classified by The World Health Organisation as a benign mixed odontogenic tumour. It develops from the dental tissues that grow into teeth. During human development, embryonic cells of ectoderm and mesenchyme produce epithelial and ectomesenchyme tissues. These proliferate and mature into ameloblasts and fibrous connective tissue, and ultimately teeth. Ameloblastic fibromas contain both of these tissues, and its name is derived from them. It is a neoplasm, meaning it is a mass of abnormal growth of cells or tissue. If the mass contains hard dental tissues they are known as odontoma, which are not true neoplasm, but classified as hamartomatous lesions.

== Treatments ==
As ameloblastic fibromas are rare and the literature regarding treatment is limited there is controversy regarding treatment approach. A conservative treatment strategy, such as enucleation and curettage, is usually sufficient for small ameloblastic fibromas. However, extensive and aggressive lesions may require radical treatment such as in older patients who have likely high recurrence tendency.

If the ameloblastic fibroma is small, 'reconstruction' will not be required. Conservative treatment usually involves enucleation and thorough curettage of the affected area alongside extraction of the affected teeth. Enucleation is the removal of an organ or tumor in such a way that it comes out clean and whole. Thorough enucleation is important as there are reports of a high recurrence rate (Trodahl reported a 36.4% recurrence rate). Immediate reconstruction is required post enucleation and curettage of the affected area. Some patients may require reconstruction which can include a full thickness bone graft. This treatment allows the patient to retain oral function and as much facial structure as possible.

Occasionally, more radical treatment is required with excision of the tumour with a margin of healthy tissue.

This kind of treatment also requires reconstruction of the affected area, with bone grafts often being the preferred choice for remodelling. This is done when the tumour is large or is deemed to have a high chance of malignant transformation. In some cases the fibroma may envelop a nerve and may have to be removed too.

Implants in compromised areas filled with a bone graft can prove useful for functional and aesthetic stability. Implant retained prosthesis can be placed and can make a vital overall functional and masticatory difference.

Close radiographic and clinical follow up is important to identify recurrence and malignant transformation.

== Epidemiology ==
Odontogenic tumours are uncommon, with a prevalence of around 2% and only 1-2% of these are ameloblastic fibromas. As they are rare, there is limited evidence available, mostly case studies. There is a slight male predilection, developing most commonly within the first two decades of life. They are often identified when tooth development is complete with the posterior mandible being the most common site. Although benign, ameloblastic fibromas that occur in later decades as well as a third of treated ameloblastic fibromas can recur and around 11% may undergo malignant transformation, though this figure is questioned. Odontoma are the most prevalent of the odontogenic tumours in the early decades.

== See also ==
- Ameloblastoma
- Ameloblastic fibro-odontoma
