= Osiris Therapeutics =

Medical research company

- Industry: Pharmaceuticals
- Headquarters: Columbia, Maryland, United States
- Key people: Peter Friedli (Chairman); Greg Law (CFO); Frank Czworka (COO); Alla Danilkovitch (CSO); James Burns (Co-Founder); Dr. Arnold Caplan (Co-Founder); Kevin Kimberlin (Co-Founder)
- Products: Grafix, Stravix, Cartiform, BIO4, Osteocel, Prochymal
- Website: www.osiris.com

Osiris Therapeutics, Inc. was an American company founded in March 1993 following the identification of mesenchymal stem cells (MSCs) by Dr. Arnold Caplan and colleagues at Case Western Reserve University in Cleveland, Ohio. Dr. Caplan contributed a license to certain technology and joined Kevin Kimberlin, James S. Burns, a biotech venture capitalist, and Peter Friedli, as lead investor, to launch Osiris, named after the Egyptian god of fertility, resurrection, and the afterlife. Early financing was provided by a number of entities, including Friedli Corporate Finance, Three Arch Bay Health Sciences Fund, and Spencer Trask & Co. By 1994, the state of Maryland provided a loan and equity investment to lure the company from Ohio in 1995.

== History ==
In 1997, Osiris began a multi-million dollar research and licensing arrangement with Novartis, which acquired 8% of the company. Novartis dedicated 65 employees to develop stem cell treatments for bone and cartilage disorders, such as osteoporosis and arthritis. Osiris also held a majority stake in Gryphon, a blood stem cell technology firm spun out of Johns Hopkins Medical School.

The company's first chief executive officer (CEO) was co-founder James Burns, who held the position from the company's inception through at least 1999. The company's Chief Financial Officer around this time was Michael Demchuk Jr. In April 1999, Science magazine published the characterization of the MSC and data generated by Osiris scientists supporting the MSC's ability to differentiate in vitro into bone, cartilage and fat. This paper has been cited 29,678 times as of August 2024.

In 2006, when the company had 84 employees, Jeffries and Lazard Capital Markets took Osiris public, on NASDAQ, offering up 13% of the company as shares and raising $38.5 million, with funds intended for research, product development, loan servicing and clinical trial expenses. C. Randall Mills was CEO. By the time of the IPO, Osiris was marketing the first commercial product in the United States containing adult stem cells. Marketed for fusion, it was called Osteocel. The company sold Osteocel to NuVasive in 2009 for an upfront payment of $35 million at closing, and an additional $50 million in milestone payments. In 2009, Osiris entered a billion-dollar agreement with Genzyme for cell therapy, receiving a $130 million up-front payment along with milestone payments for the development of Prochymal.

== Research ==
In May 2012, Osiris received the first regulatory clearance in the world for a systemically administered stem cell drug, called Prochymal or remestemcel-L, which was approved for pediatric Graft-versus-Host Disease (GvHD). Prochymal is a mesenchymal stem cell therapy derived from the bone marrow of healthy young adult donors, in which stem cells are isolated, expanded in culture, and processed to produce up to 10,000 doses from a single donation. It was subsequently approved in Japan for Crohn's disease and the European Union for perianal fistulas. In 2013, Osiris sold its MSC drug and associated patents to Mesoblast of Australia and renamed the drug Ryoncil. Proceeds from this sale allowed the company to focus on its line of wound-healing products.

THe transition by Osiris from product research to commercialization began with the introduction of Graphix, Stravix, and Chondrogen. In 2014, the peer-reviewed International Wound Journal reported the efficacy of Grafix for the treatment of diabetic foot ulcers. CEO Lode Debrabandere resigned in 2016 in conjunction with activities that led to. Its temporary delisting from the NASDAQ stock exchange after the company failed to meet the exchange's requirements, including filing an annual report. Debrabandere was succeeded by the company's chief business officer, Dwayne Montgomery, followed by Linda Palczuk, formerly of AstraZeneca. The company was relisted on the NASDAQ in August 2018.

The company had $142 million in revenues for 2018. In 2019, Osiris was acquired for $660 million by Smith & Nephew plc, a global medical technology business. All 360 employees were expected to remain with the firm, which would operate as a subsidiary to its parent.

Ryoncil was successfully tested in a March 2020 pilot study at Mount Sinai Hospital in New York City on late-stage, ventilator-assisted COVID-19 patients suffering Acute Respiratory Distress Syndrome (ARDS). Based on the results, the U.S. Food and Drug Administration approved a Phase 2/3 study on 240 patients at 30 sites around the U.S. The Cardiothoracic Surgical Trials Network ran the study, which was funded by the National Institutes of Health, and Mesoblast (the owner of the product) commenced the trial on May 5, 2020.

In December 2024, the FDA approved Ryoncil (remestemcel-L), as the first mesenchymal stromal cell (MSC) therapy for pediatric patients with steroid-refractory acute graft-versus-host disease (GVHD).

== Publications ==
All authors were affiliated with Osiris unless otherwise noted.

- Pittenger MF, Mackay AM, Beck SC, Jaiswal RK, Douglas R, Mosca JD, Moorman MA, Simonetti DW, Craig S, Marshak DR (2 April 1999). "Multilineage Potential of Adult Human Mesenchymal Stem Cells". Science. 284 (5411): 143–7. Bibcode:1999Sci...284..143P. doi:10.1126/science.284.5411.143. PMID 10102814.
  - This article includes description of the adult stem cell harvesting method that provided Osiris a competitive advantage over other firms in being able to productively support clinical trials.
