= Prochymal =

Stem cell therapy

Prochymal is a stem cell therapy made by Osiris Therapeutics. It is the first stem cell therapy approved by Canada. It is also the first therapy approved by Canada for acute graft-vs-host disease (GvHD). Also known as remestemcel-L, Prochymal was sold to Australia-based Mesoblast in 2013 at which time its brand name was changed to Ryoncil.

It is an allogeneic stem therapy based on mesenchymal stem cells (also medicinal signalling cells, mesenchymal stromal cells, and MSCs) derived from the bone marrow of adult donors. MSCs are purified from the marrow, cultured and packaged, with up to 10,000 doses derived from a single donor. The doses are stored frozen until needed.

== Approvals and indications ==
In May 2012 Health Canada approved the use of remestemcel-L (Prochymal) for the management of acute GvHD in children who are unresponsive to steroids, with the approval conditional upon further trials being conducted.

Separately, a pilot study of Ryoncil on ventilator-assisted COVID-19 patients with Acute Respiratory Distress Syndrome provided sufficient evidence for the FDA to approve a Phase 2/3 placebo-controlled trial on 300 patients. That trial commenced enrollment on May 5, 2020. It is being overseen by Mount Sinai Hospital and the Cardiothoracic Clinical Trials Network and funded by the National Institutes of Health.

== Clinical trials ==
Preliminary results of a phase III trial for GvHD were released in Sept 2009.

== See also ==
- Cell therapy
