= Tom Smith (hairstylist) =

British hairstylist (born 1992)

- Born: May 28, 1992 (age 34); Maidstone, England
- Occupations: Hairstylist; Entrepreneur
- Years active: 2008 - present
- Known for: Bottleneck Bangs; Expensive Blonde; Cowboy Copper

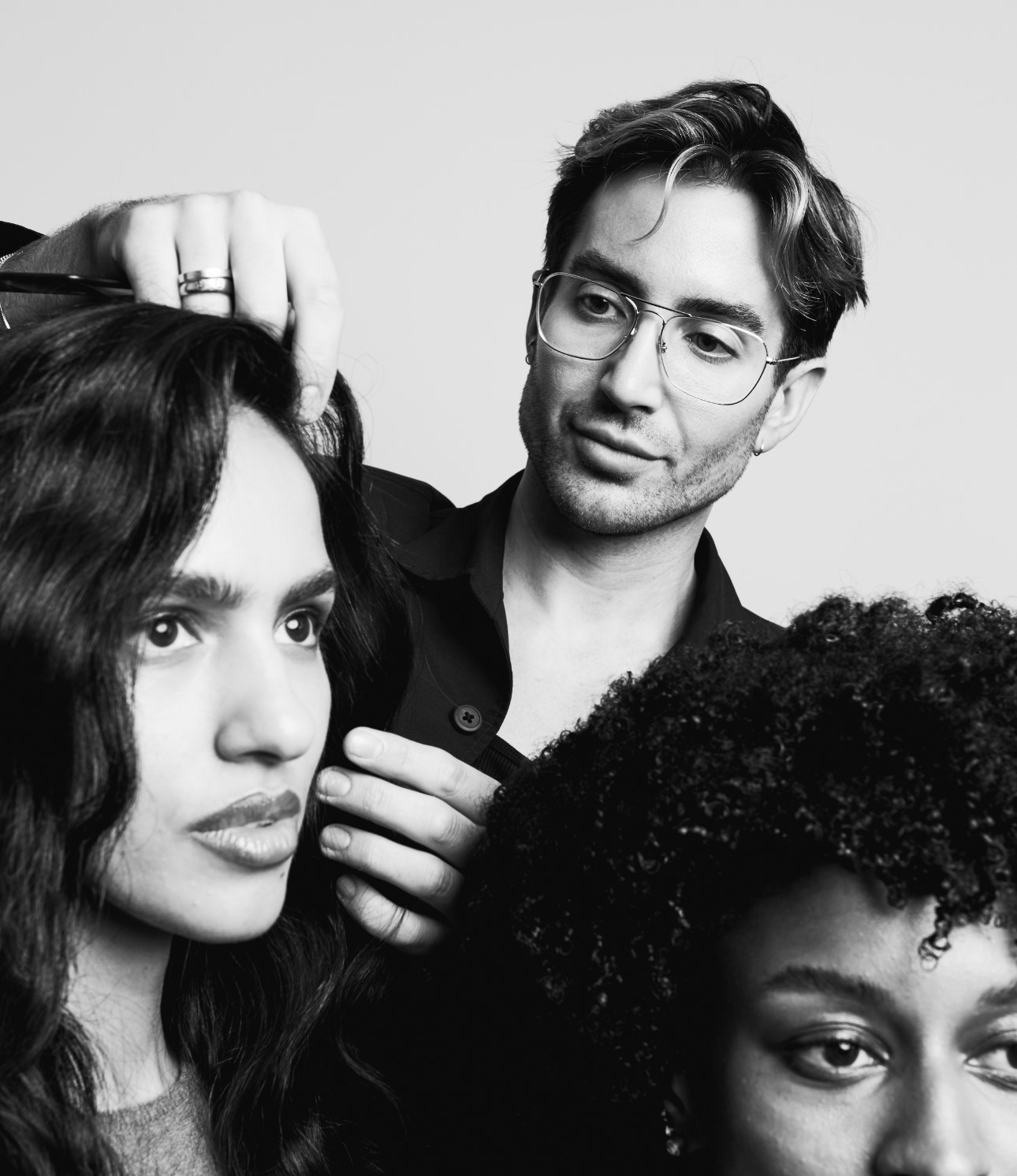
Tom Smith

Tom Smith (born 28 May 1992) is a British hairstylist, hair health expert, entrepreneur and trend forecaster based in London.

== Early life ==
Smith was born in 1992, in Maidstone, England, into a working-class family. At the age of 14, he began working in a local hair salon, before being directed by the salon owner, who had witnessed his creative potential, to interview for Vidal Sassoon's Sassoons Salon, where he joined their apprenticeship program in 2008.

== Career ==
Between 2008 and 2011, Smith worked as an apprentice at Sassoon Salon in Mayfair, London. In 2011, he moved to Fitzrovia and began working at Billi Currie, a luxury hair salon in Marylebone, where he eventually served as a Creative Director. In 2014, he was brought on as part of the team to launch Olaplex to the United Kingdom market. In 2016, he was appointed International Creative Director at Evo, an Australian hair-care brand. In 2026, Smith was named as the new global ambassador for hair-care biotechnology brand K18.

In 2025, Smith co-founded AEVUM, a luxury salon located in Bloomsbury, London. Described as a "next-generation salon", AEVUM offers hair health and wellness treatments alongside styling services. AEVUM utilizes high tech products including Dyson hair dryers, red light therapy devices from brand CurrentBody LED, and stem-cell based hair regeneration therapies from biotechnology brand CALECIM Professional, where Smith also serves as an ambassador.

Smith is widely known for predicting viral and global hair trends. He is credited with creating hairstyles such as Bottleneck Bangs, Expensive Blonde, and Cowboy Copper. He has been featured in several publications including British Vogue, Harpers Bazaar, Tatler, Grazia, Stylist, Elle, Forbes and Glamour.

He has lectured at several hair conferences around the globe and regularly presents at industry events. Smith has also served as a judge at various national and international consumer and magazine awards, including the 2026 Marie Claire UK Hair Awards.

Smith has won multiple major hair industry awards, including Colour Communicator Genius at the 2024 Colour World Genius Awards, and was named a Beauty Launchpad 30 Under 30 winner in 2020.
