= PI3 =

PI3 may refer to:

- Peptidase inhibitor 3
- Phosphorus triiodide
- Phosphoinositide 3-kinase
- PI3, a plasma injector developed and built by General Fusion
