= Follicle =

Follicle may refer to:

- Follicle (anatomy), a small spherical group of cells containing a cavity:
  - Dental follicle
  - Hair follicle
  - Lymph follicle
  - Ovarian follicle
  - Thyroid follicle
- Follicle (fruit)

== See also ==
- Follicular lymphoma, a common form of blood cancer
