= Cord lining =

Cord lining, cord tissue, or umbilical cord lining membrane, is the outermost layer of the umbilical cord. As the umbilical cord itself is an extension of the placenta, the umbilical cord lining membrane is an extension of the amniotic membrane covering the placenta. The umbilical cord lining membrane comprises two layers: the amniotic (or epithelial) layer and the sub-amniotic (or mesenchymal) layer. The umbilical cord lining membrane is a rich source of two strains of stem cells (CLSCs): epithelial stem cells (from the amniotic layer) (CLECs) and mesenchymal stem cells (from the sub-amniotic layer) (CLMCs). Discovered by Singapore-based CellResearch Corporation in 2004, this is the best known source for harvesting human stem cells.

== Cross-section of the umbilical cord ==
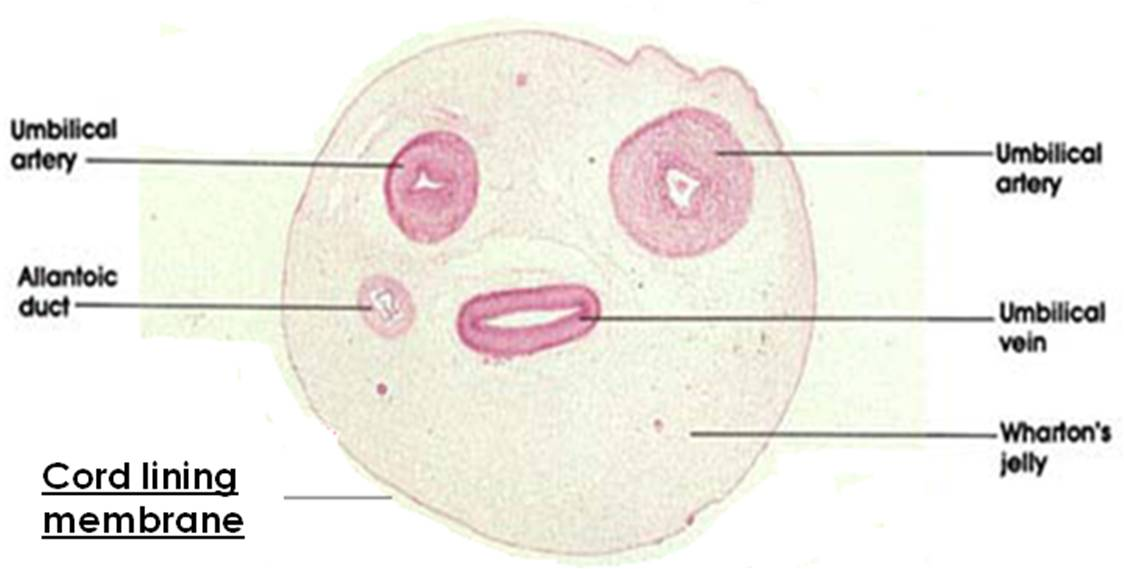
A histological cross section of the umbilical cord showing the umbilical cord lining membrane.

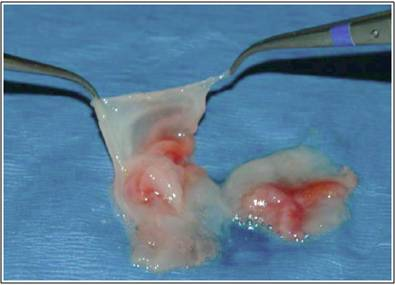
Dissection of the umbilical cord to demonstrate the cord lining membrane (held up with forceps). Umbilical cord vessels and Wharton's Jelly have been dissected free.

=== Source of mesenchymal stem cells ===
The sub-amniotic region of the umbilical cord lining has been reported to be a source of mesenchymal stem cells termed (CLMCs). These cells express MSC specific markers such as NT5E (cluster of differentiation73), endoglin (CD105) as well as Oct 3/4 and NANOG. Furthermore, these CLMCs can also be differentiated in-vitro into osteogenic, chondrogenic and adipogenic lineages. MSC from the sub-epithelial region of the cord lining can be expanded in-vitro for more than 30 passages or 90 population doublings without losing their multi-lineage differentiation capability or going into senescence.

MSC isolated from the cord lining membrane have been reported to be immune-privileged. Compared with MSC from the bone marrow, cord lining MSC showed more effective immune suppression presumably due to lower expression of HLA Class I on their surfaces and also higher expression of immune suppressive cytokines. Compared with MSC from cord blood, placenta and Wharton's Jelly, cord lining MSC showed the highest proliferation and migration potential. Furthermore, they expressed lower levels of HLA Class I and II, contributing to their lower immunogenicity.

Pre-clinical studies performed on the cord lining MSC have revealed their potential in repairing heart muscle damage due to ischemia. A study performed in the rat model showed improved heart function and reduction of damaged myocardium when cord lining MSC combined with a fibrin gel carrier and a vascularized graft were introduced to the ischaemic area. A similar study combining the cord lining MSC with carrier endothelial cells within a fibrin matrix in-vivo also revealed improvement in cardiac function, reduction in scar tissue formation and better vascularization.

== Source of epithelial stem cells ==
The amniotic layer of the umbilical cord lining has been shown to contain a large population of epithelial stem cells (EpSC). These cord lining EpSC exhibit classical pluripotent stem cell markers such as SSEA-4, Oct-4, SOX2 and Nanog. They also express p63, a specific marker of epithelial progenitor cells. In-vitro organotypic culture of cord lining EpSC using the air-liquid interface method resulted in stratified epithelium being formed with expression of various forms of cytokeratins. Furthermore, due to their similarity in terms of phenotypic expression of keratins compared to normal human epidermal keratinocytes, cord lining EpSC have the potential to be an alternative source of cells for skin repair and regeneration.

Animal studies on cord lining EpSC have shown that genetic modifications using the proinsulin gene allowed transplanted stem cells to lower blood glucose levels in diabetic animals. These cells also express HLA-G in the transmembrane and soluble form, aiding in their immunosuppressive behavior. In vitro studies also indicated that cord lining EpSC can be differentiated biochemically to become hepatocyte-like cells (liver cells) as shown by the expression of hepatic-specific markers such as â-fetoprotein, albumin and hepatocyte-specific cytokeratins.

Cord lining EpSC show similarities to limbal stem cells in terms of expression of ABCG2, HES1 and BMI1 in addition to p63. When transplanted onto rabbit eyes with corneal defects on a human amniotic membrane scaffold, these stem cells could reconstitute the natural morphology of the corneal epithelium similar to that of a natural corneal surface. The stem cells included a unique mucin-expressing cord lining epithelial stem cell (CLEC-muc) expressing (MUC1). Such results were not seen when human amniotic membrane was used without the cells indicating the therapeutic value of the cord lining EpSC.
