= Dental follicle =

Anatomical entity

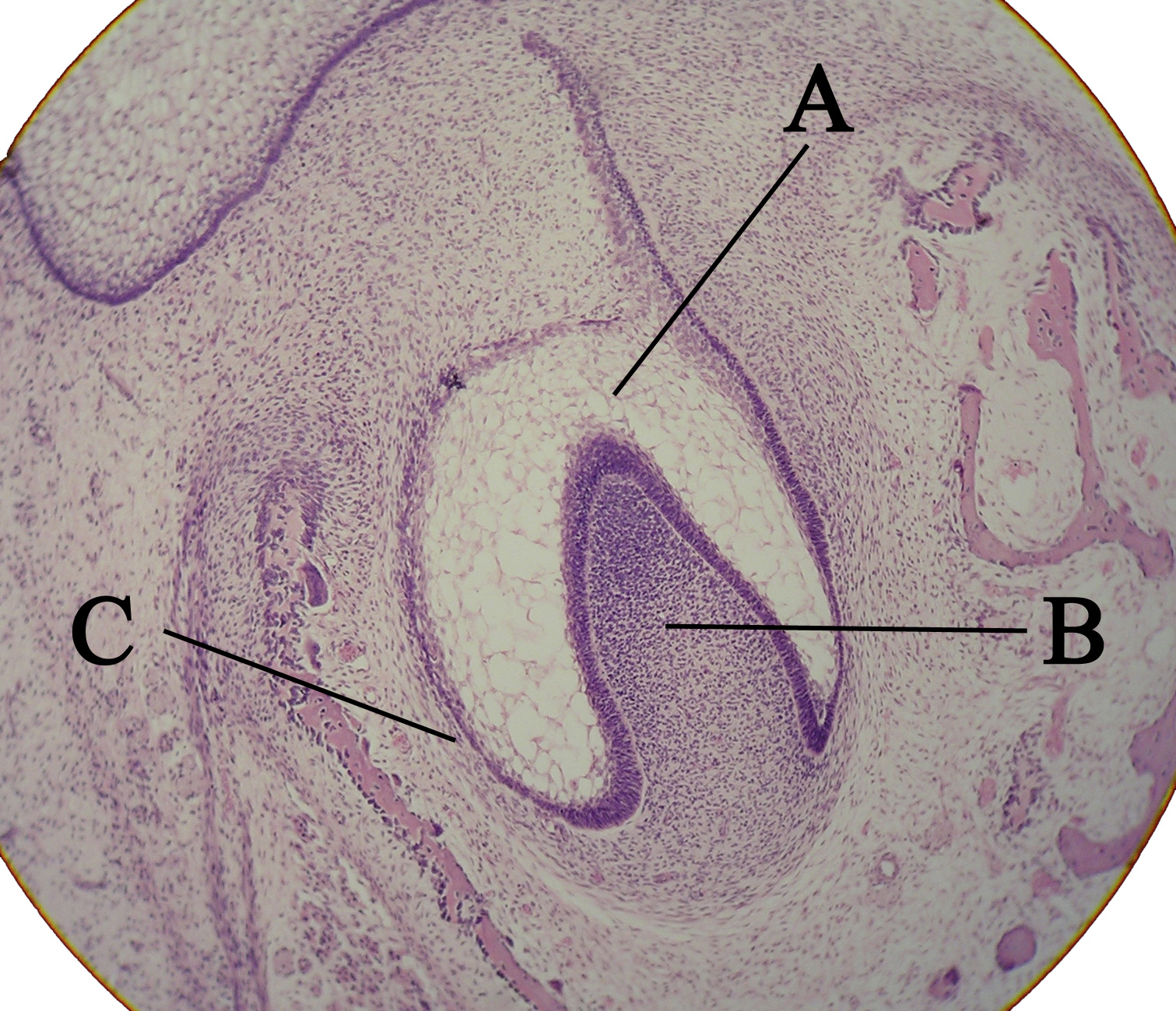
Histologic slide showing a tooth bud. A: enamel organ B: dental papilla C: dental follicle

The dental follicle, also known as dental sac, is made up of mesenchymal cells and fibres surrounding the enamel organ and dental papilla of a developing tooth. It is a vascular fibrous sac containing the developing tooth and its odontogenic organ. The dental follicle (DF) differentiates into the periodontal ligament. In addition, it may be the precursor of other cells of the periodontium, including osteoblasts, cementoblasts and fibroblasts. They develop into the alveolar bone, the cementum with Sharpey's fibers and the periodontal ligament fibers respectively. Similar to dental papilla, the dental follicle provides nutrition to the enamel organ and dental papilla and also have an extremely rich blood supply.

== Role in tooth eruption ==
The formative role of the dental follicle starts when the crown of the tooth is fully developed and just before tooth eruption into the oral cavity.

Although tooth eruption mechanisms have yet to be understood entirely, generally it can be agreed that many factors, together, affect the tooth eruption process which is why it is very difficult to differentiate the causes and effects. There have been many theories proposed for tooth eruption. Ideas such as remodelling of the alveolar bone, root elongation and to a certain extent, the most probable reasoning for tooth eruption in human beings is the formation of the periodontal ligament.

=== Bone remodelling ===
Bone remodelling of the jaws has been associated to tooth eruption such that in the pre-eruptive phase of a tooth, the natural pattern of growth of the maxilla or mandible would theoretically move teeth by the selective deposition and reabsorption of bone in the adjacent surroundings of the tooth. A sequence of experiments in dogs does provide the most reliable substantiation to prove that bone remodelling is a cause of tooth movement.

When an eruption is stopped by wiring the tooth germ on to the lower margin of the mandible or when the dental follicle remains undisturbed as the developing pre-molar is removed, osteoclasts enlarge the gubernacular canal while an eruptive pathway develops within the bone covering over the enucleated tooth. However, no eruptive pathway will develop if the dental follicle is removed. Furthermore, the replica will erupt with the development of an eruptive pathway as long as the dental follicle is preserved when an exact silicone or metal duplicate replaces the tooth germ.

Such observations should be examined judiciously and in great detail. Firstly, eruptive pathways have unmistakably been demonstrated to develop in bone deprived of a budding or growing tooth. Secondly, they provided evidence to prove that the dental follicle is involved in the process. Therefore, it is only when concurrent bone deposition can be confirmed at the base of the crypt and inhibition of such bone deposition can be demonstrated to show interference with tooth eruption, then the conclusion that an eruptive pathway forming within bone means that bony remodelling is the cause for tooth formation.

In many studies, with the usage of tetracyclines as indicators of bone deposition have proven that bone resorption is principal activity in the fundus of an alveolus in a number of species, including human beings. For example, in human beings, the base of the crypt of the permanent first molars and permanent third molars will repeatedly reabsorb as the eruption of these teeth occur, although, in the second molars and second premolars, there will be some bone deposition on the crypt floor. For the circumstance of a dormant duplicate's demonstrated eruption, many would think that the bony remodelling would be the only reason. However, as per what will be discussed next, it can be concluded that follicular tissue is accountable for this movement as supported by pieces of evidence. Furthermore, in some recent research, it has been observed that alveolar bone growth at the base of the crypt is a prerequisite for molar tooth eruption in rats. Undoubtedly, more attention needs to be given to the intraosseous tooth eruption. Regardless of whether bone growth is a main moving force, it can widely be agreed that for tooth eruption to happen, the dental follicle is required and that, as will be discussed later, the dental follicle regulates bone remodelling.

=== Dental follicle ===
Researches show a repeated series of cellular activities which involves the reduced dental epithelium and the follicle linked to tooth eruption that assists bone absorption and connective tissue degradation. With the lack of colony-stimulating factor 1, a factor that encourages differentiation of osteoclasts, in osteopetrotic animals, no mechanism for bone removal is present and therefore eruption is prevented. The eruption will happen when differentiation of osteoclasts is allowed due to local administration of the colony-stimulating factor 1. Proteases, which is produced by the reduced enamel epithelium, results in a path of least resistance as it promotes the breakdown of connective tissue. When stimulating alveolar bone growth at the base of the crypt, expression of the bone morphogenetic protein-6 in the dental follicle may also be necessary.

It is also thought that signalling between the dental follicle and the reduced enamel epithelium exists. This signalling could be a plausible reason for the noteworthy regularity of eruption timings because the enamel epithelium is most possibly programmed as part of its functional life cycle. Signalling would also aid in explaining why radicular follicle, that is not related to reduced enamel epithelium, is involved in the formation of the periodontal ligament but does not experience degeneration.

=== Periodontal ligament ===
Cells of dental follicle will differentiate into collagen forming fibroblast of cementoblasts and periodontal ligaments, that produces and secretes cementum on the surface of the tooth roots. As the tooth roots break apart, some cells of the dental follicle will invade the roots of the tooth. Delicate fibres that appear along the developing roots near the cervical region of the crown will also be formed by some cells of the ligament. These are most likely the stem cell fibroblasts that form principle fibre groups that will surface as the roots lengthen. As fibres become implanted in the cementum of the root surface, the other end will be attached to the forming alveolar bone.

Rejuvenation and development of the periodontal ligament have been taken as a factor in the eruption of the tooth due to the traction power possessed by fibroblasts and because of experimental results relying on the unceasingly erupting rat incisor. The case is not the same where the existence of a periodontal ligament does not always correspond with resorption in teeth that have limited growth period. Cases do however happen in which rootless teeth erupt and when a periodontal ligament is present, and the tooth does not erupt.

One significant difference in the formation of fibres exists between teeth that have predecessors and teeth that do not have predecessors. For the former group of teeth (such as the permanent incisors, the canines and the premolars), the principal fibres group will develop later than in the latter group of teeth (such as the deciduous teeth and the permanent molars). It can be observed that the coronal half of the periodontal ligament is made up of well composed, obliquely orientated principal collagen fibre bundles when an erupting permanent molar enters into the oral cavity. The opposite is true too. A majority of the periodontal ligament of an erupting permanent premolar is deprived of a discernable number of organized principal collagen fibre bundles passing from tooth to alveolar bone.

=== Molecular determinants of tooth eruption ===
Tooth eruption is a closely controlled process which involves the tooth organ, consisting of the dental follicle and the enamel organ, and adjacent alveolar tissues. The balance between tissue formation of bone, periodontal ligament and root, and tissue destruction of bone, connective tissue and epithelium causes tooth movement. Osteoclasts are gathered from circulating monocytes which are chemically drawn to the location where bone resorption takes place during bone remodelling. A growth factor, colony-stimulating factor 1, produced by the dental follicle, encourages the differentiation of monocytes into macrophages and osteoclasts. In addition, as a result of the epidermal growth factor, the enamel organ produces interleukin-1 alpha, a promoter of bone resorption, that induces follicular cells to produce the colony-stimulating factor 1. In the process of tooth eruption, monocyte chemotactic protein-1 may also be involved.

Signalling via the receptor-activated Nuclear factor kB or receptor- activated Nuclear factor kB ligand or osteoprotegerin pathway controls osteoclastogenesis. In the apex of the dental follicle, osteoprotegerin prevents osteoclast formation, and its expression is down-regulated. Ultimately, accentuation of the differentiation of osteoblasts at the base of the alveolar crypt is accentuated. A high level of transcription factor Runt-related transcription factor- 2, that is involved in osteoblast differentiation and function, is indicated in the basal portion of the dental follicle. Down-regulation of the expression of the Runt-related transcription factor- 2 in the apex portion of the dental follicle, that supports bone removal along the surface which the tooth erupts, is due to the transforming growth factor b. Acceleration of incisor eruption in rodents has been proven to be affected by the epidermal growth factor which increases the level of expression for the transformation of growth factor b.

== Role in development of Odontogenic Cysts and Tumours ==
=== Role in development of odontogenic cysts and tumour ===
The most common pathologies associated with dental follicle are dentigerous cyst, keratocystic odontogenic tumor and ameloblastoma. Carcinomas, such as primary intraosseous carcinoma and the other tumors including sarcoma and bromixoma can also be associated with dental follicle.

Dentigerous (follicular) cyst

The second most common odontogenic cyst is the follicular cyst. The cyst develops in normal dental follicule surrounding an unerupted tooth. It can also develop from break down of stellate reticulum or collection of fluid between the reduced enamel epithelium layers.

Clinical features

The dentigerous cyst is often found in areas where unerupted teeth are found. These areas, in decreasing order of frequency, are mandibular third molars, maxillary third molars and maxillary canines. The cyst may grow to a large size, replace the tooth with which they are associated, or hardly cause resorption of adjacent tooth roots.

Diagnosis

Clinical and radiographic assessments are required to diagnose dentigerous cysts. A cyst is present when the follicular space exceeds 5mm from the crown. However, it is possible that keratocysts and ameloblastomas mimic the radiographical appearance of follicular cysts. Aspiration can be used to differentiate the lesions.

Treatment

- Marsupialization

This procedure is partial removal of associated tooth. The advantage of this procedure is that it maintains the vitality of teeth and is less invasive. The disadvantage is that it required substantial after care and heals very slowly.

- Enucleation

This procedure is complete removal of the associated tooth. The advantage of enucleation is that the cyst cavity heals eventually and the full cyst tissue is available for histological examination. The disadvantage is that if the cyst involves the apices of adjacent vital teeth, the surgery might deprive the teeth of their blood supply and kill the vital teeth.

=== Odontogenic Tumors ===
Odontogenic tumors may consist of odontogenic epithelium, odontogenic connective tissue or both. Odontogenic tumours consisting predominantly of epithelium arise from odontogenic epithelium. Odontogenic tumours composed of odontogenic connective tissue arise from the ectomesenchymal region of the tooth germ, either from the dental papilla or the dental follicle. Odontogenic tumours of mixed origin contain both ameloblastic epithelium and odontoblastic tissue while in active growth. After complete development, it principally consists of enamel, dentine and cementum.

== Dental Follicle Stem Cells ==
The presence of stem cells in the dental is an integral part of the DF's ability to differentiate into the periodontal ligament. Current knowledge about the stem cells present in DFs, is based on the extraction of DFs from immature roots of impacted teeth. In Comparison to the DF of a typically erupted tooth, the DF of an impacted tooth, e.g. third molar, does not surround the tooth and subsequently be divided into two parts.

The periapical section: This surrounds the apex of the developing tooth root and mediates tooth eruption. The coronal section: This is attached to developing tooth root and mediates bone growth. Stem cells isolated from these two parts are summarised below.

=== Multipotentectomesenchymal Precursor Cells ===
Multipotentectomesenchymal precursor cells also referred to as DFCs are found in the coronal part of the DF of impacted human third molar teeth contains. DFCs are considered multipotent, and they are especially precursors for cells of the tooth attachment apparatus Cells of this tissue structure express typical markers for PDL fibroblast, alveolar osteoblasts, and cementoblasts. When cultivated, DFCs have a morphology that is comparable to that of a fibroblast and express markers such as Nestin and STRO-1 which are typical markers for dental stem cells. These cells have are highly proliferate and proliferate typically at a higher rate than that of a proliferating bone marrow- derived Mesenchymal stem cell.

==== Regulation of DFCs ====
The initiation of differentiation is controlled by a number of different extracellular factors, such as growth factors, cell-cell contacts, extracellular matrix, and mechanical loading. These factors coordinate to induce or modulate the process of differentiation into particular functional body cell type.

There have been some studies done recently about the differentiation of cultivated DFCs into biomineralising cells. These studies revealed new ways in which the cell differentiation mechanisms work. Moreover, information about genome-wide expression profiles was provided by proteomics and transcriptomics with DFCs. These help in showing more clearly the molecular mechanisms in cells. The extracellular signal regulated kinase (ERK) pathway was also revealed during the osteogenic differentiation of DFCs by these investigations.

The proteomics and transcriptomics identified regulated transcription factors such as SP1 and TP53. These transcription factors were more precisely identified by bioinformatics after the analysis of the proteome. The role of these transcription factors regulate the cell proliferation and differentiation of DFCs.

Human dental follicle cells are progenitor cells. Different studies suggested that osteogenic differentiation of DFCs is controlled by BMP2 and IGF2, which are growth factors. However, the influence of BMP2 and IGF2 on the differentiation of DFCs has not been analysed in too much depth. There was a study that examined DFCs after the induction of osteogenic differentiation with BMP2, IGF2 and a standard osteogenic differentiation medium (ODM) with dexamethasone. The alkaline phosphatase activity and the calcium accumulation showed osteogenic differentiation after all treatments, but with the most effective differentiation by ODM. Furthermore, markers of the process of osteoblast differentiation were much higher up-regulated in BMP2- or IGF2-treated cells than in ODM-treated cells. To find the reason between these differences, the genome-wide expression profiles were compared at an early differentiation stage. Chondroblast markers in BMP2-differentiated cells and general markers for cell differentiation/proliferation in IGF2-treated cells were significantly regulated. However, ODM-treated DFCs expressed late markers of osteogenic-differentiated DFCs such as the transcription factor ZBTB16 that is not expressed in BMP2- or IGF2-differentiated cells. Therefore, this study shows that osteogenic differentiation of DFCs can be triggered with all tested inducers. However to analyse this mechanism, the transcription factor ZBTB16 is a target for further investigations.

DLX3, a transcription factor, which is related to the induced BMP2 pathway in osteogenic differentiated DFCs was able to trigger cell viability and the osteogenic differentiation of DFCs via the BMP2/Smad1 feedback loop ).

DFCs control the proportional amount of all three periodontal tissues, which includes a good balance between the size of the periodontal ligament and the amount of the surrounding cementum and alveolar bone. A high level of periodontal ligament in the periodontium supports the growth of the cementum and the alveolar bone. This is why a soft extracellular matrix supports the osteogenic differentiation of DFCs.

==== The Migration Capacity of DFCs ====
The migration capacity of DFCs can be histological examined, during this, DFCs demonstrate an extensive migratory capacity for dental mesenchymal stem cells, during the initial stages of tooth root development. When compared with the migration capacity of stem cells from the dental pulp of baby teeth and stem cells from the dental apical papilla (dental neural crest derived progenitor cells, dNC-PCs), DFCs are found to have the highest cell migration velocity. Furthermore, DFC migration can be accelerated during cultivation, with the use of growth factors found in the dental hard tissue matrix such as TGF-β or BMP2 which have also been found to be involved in the differentiation of DFCs

==== Follicle-Derived Embryonic Neural Crest Stem Cells (FENCSCs) ====
FENCSCs are a sub-population of DFCs, however both differ in their in cell migration properties. FENSCs express high levels of embryonic stem cell markers (TRA1-60, TRA1-81, OCT-4) and mRNA transcripts for Nanog and Rex-1. They have the ability to differentiate into cells of all three germ layers. Some examples include, smooth and skeletal muscle, osteoblasts, neurons, glial cells, and adipocytes and therefore display pluripotency. These cells also have high levels of telomerase activity.

A strategy that enables isolation of specific types of stem cells within the dental follicle such as FENCSCs, is known as Fluorescent Activated Cell Sorting. Cell culturing is also important to consider understanding cellular morphology. DFCs and FENCSCs spheroid cell clusters under serum – free cell culture conditions.

The choice of adequate cell culture conditions is of great importance for a specific feature of dental stem cells. For example, both DFCs and FENCSCs form spheroid-like cell clusters under serum-free cell culture conditions.

=== Periapical Follicle Stem Cells (PAFSCs) ===
Once the development of the tooth root is completed, the DF disappears thus meaning that all cells are considered to be part of the periodontium. Prior to this stage, a periapical part of the DF attaches to the apex of the developing tooth root and is referred to as periapical follicle. Therefore, undifferentiated cells within this tissue are known as Periapical Dental Follicle Stem cells (PAFSCs) and can be isolated from colony forming cells within periapical follicle cell cultures. Typical markers expressed within these cells include, CD44 and STRO1. Both Cell migration capacity and cell proliferation capacity of these cells are greater than various types of dental mesenchymal stem cells. PFACs are targets of regenerative dentistry due to their high multipotent differentiation potential within all types of dental tissue. Despite the closely related developmental origin of PAFScs and DFScs, There is still much to learn about PAFSCs and how they compare to DFSc.

== Role in regenerative dentistry ==
Human dental follicles can be separated from impacted wisdom teeth with undeveloped tooth roots. Therefore, undifferentiated ectomesenchymal cells can be isolated from both apical and coronal parts of the human dental follicle. The dental follicle contains various types of multipotent stem cells. They are progenitors for all types of periodontal cells providing a potential cell source for periodontal regeneration.

== See also ==
- Human tooth development
- Animal tooth development
