= Ameloblastic fibro-odontoma =

- Specialty: Dentistry
- Symptoms: Tooth eruption failure
- Complications: Sinus destruction, facial disfigurement, perforated cortical plates
- Usual onset: First and second decade of life
- Frequency: Rare

The ameloblastic fibro-odontoma (AFO) is essentially a benign tumor with the features characteristic of ameloblastic fibroma along with enamel and dentin (hard tissues). Though it is generally regarded as benign, there have been cases of its malignant transformation into ameloblastic fibrosarcoma and odontogenic sarcoma. Cahn LR and Blum T, believed in "maturation theory", which suggested that AFO was an intermediate stage and eventually developed during the period of tooth formation to a complex odontoma thus, being a hamartoma.

The World Health Organization (WHO) defines AFO as a neoplasm consisting of odontogenic ectomesenchyme resembling the dental papilla, epithelial strands and nest resembling dental lamina and enamel organ conjunction with the presence of dentin and enamel. There is a consensus that AFO should be grouped under odontomas. This is because once the hard tissues start forming it will eventually lead to formation of odontomas. The WHO classification published in 2017 has grouped AFDs (ameloblastic fibro-dentinomas) into odontomes. According to Tekkesin S et al, combination of age and lesion size should be used to distinguish between lesions of a true neoplastic nature and hamartomatous formation.

== History ==
Initially, AFO was called as ameloblastic odontoma. Hooker in 1967 first used the term ameloblastic fibro-odontoma. WHO classified odontogenic tumors for the first time in 1971 (1st edition). In 2005, mixed tumors were included in the classification of odontogenic tumors by WHO as tumors having odontogenic epithelium along with odontogenic ectomesenchyme. This includes ameloblastic fibroma (AF), ameloblastic fibro-dentinoma (AFD), ameloblastic fibro-odontoma (AFO) and odontoma amongst others. According to the continuum concept, AF, AFD, AFO and odontoma lie in the same spectrum but at different sides depending upon the maturation with AF and odontoma lying completely opposite whereas AFD and AFO lying between them. AFO consists of odontogenic epithelium along with enamel and dentin. Such inductive changes along with proliferating odontogenic epithelium warrant AFO to be regarded as a separate entity.

Key Highlights for Differentiation (Histologically)
Lesion	Components	Histological Difference
AF	Neoplastic epithelium + Ectomesenchyme	
AFD	Neoplastic epithelium + Ectomesenchyme + Dentin	
AFO	Neoplastic epithelium + Ectomesenchyme + Enamel + Dentin	
Odontome	Neoplastic epithelium (non-proliferating) + Ectomesenchyme + {Enamel + Dentin in unorganized fashion}	

== Histogenesis ==
AFO is regarded as a benign mixed odontogenic tumor. Cahn and Blum first advocated continuum concept but this was later rejected. AFO is now considered as a distinct entity. AFO exhibits the same benign biologic behavior as that of AF, along with inductive changes that lead to the formation of both dentin and enamel.

== Prevalence ==
AFO is a rare odontogenic tumor and accounts for around 2% of all the jaw tumors. This neoplasm usually occurs in the first and second decade of life and is most common in the posterior region of mandible. There appears no gender predilection. Slootweg PJ established that the data on age, site, and sex were consistent with the concept that the AFO was an immature complex odontoma, thereby indicating that AFO was a hamartoma.

== Clinical presentation ==
AFO is seen in younger age groups, commonly in the second decade of life. Failure and failure of tooth eruption are the most common presenting complaints. In case of large swellings, it may show deformity and show displacement of erupted teeth. Pain and paresthesia are not features of AFO. Accidental discovery during radiographical investigation may be possible. The lesion occurs most commonly in the posterior region of the jaw (mandible). Massive maxillary AFOs cause destruction of the sinus, facial disfigurement, perforated the cortical plates or extended to the orbital floor-pterygoid region.

== Radiographical features ==
AFO is essentially a radiolucent lesion that is generally unilocular and rarely multilocular. The radiolucency contains calcified material depicting as radio-opaque areas of variable size. The amount of calcified material present is variable and hence the lesion may be either radiolucent, radio-opaque or mixed. Associated crown of the unerupted tooth may be evident.

== Histopathology ==
The cell-rich mesenchymal tissue resembles the primitive dental papilla. The odontogenic epithelium may be either arranged as follicles that resemble developing enamel organ or they may be seen as cords or strands. The peripheral cells of the follicles resemble ameloblast like cells The odontogenic epithelium is scattered in a loose connective tissue stroma that closely resembles dental papilla. Calcified material may resemble enamel or dentin matrix. The mature lesions may show enamel or dentin aggregates.
