= Odontogenic tumor =

Any of the forms of odontogenic neoplasm

- Specialty: Oncology

An odontogenic tumor is a neoplasm of the cells or tissues that initiate odontogenic processes.

Examples include:

- Adenomatoid odontogenic tumor
- Ameloblastic fibroma
- Ameloblastic fibro-odontoma
- Ameloblastoma, a type of odontogenic tumor involving ameloblasts
- Ameloblastic fibrosarcoma
- Calcifying cystic odontogenic tumor
- Calcifying epithelial odontogenic tumor
- Cementoblastoma
- Cementoma
- Odontogenic keratocyst
- Odontogenic carcinoma
- Odontogenic myxoma
- Odontoma
- Squamous odontogenic tumour
