= Axatilimab =

Monoclonal antibody

Monoclonal antibody
- Type: Whole antibody
- Source: Humanized
- Target: CSF-1R

Clinical data
- Trade names: Niktimvo
- Other names: axatilimab-csfr
- AHFS/Drugs.com: Monograph
- MedlinePlus: a624043
- License data: US DailyMed: Axatilimab
- Routes of administration: Intravenous
- Drug class: Antineoplastic
- ATC code: None

Legal status
- Legal status: US: ℞-only

Identifiers
- CAS Number: 2155851-88-8
- DrugBank: DB16388
- UNII: R96Z451BMC
- KEGG: D11952

Chemical and physical data
- Formula: C_{6568}H_{10092}N_{1696}O_{2052}S_{48}
- Molar mass: 147185.68 g·mol^{−1}

Axatilimab, sold under the brand name Niktimvo, is a monoclonal antibody used for the treatment of chronic graft-versus-host disease. It is a blocker of the colony stimulating factor-1 receptor. It is given by injection into a vein.

The most common side effects include infections; increased blood level of liver enzymes; decreased blood level of phosphate; low red blood cell count (anemia); muscle, bone, or joint pain; increased blood level of pancreatic enzymes; low energy; increased blood level of calcium; increased blood level of a muscle enzyme; increased blood level of a bone enzyme; nausea; headache; diarrhea; cough; fever; shortness of breath; and infusion related reactions. Infusion-related reactions are common and can be serious.

Axatilimab was approved for medical use in the United States in August 2024. The US Food and Drug Administration (FDA) considers it to be a first-in-class medication.

== Medical use ==
Axatilimab is indicated for the treatment of chronic graft-versus-host disease after failure of at least two prior lines of systemic therapy in people weighing at least 40 kilograms (88 lb).

== Adverse effects ==
The most common adverse reactions include increased aspartate aminotransferase (AST), infection (pathogen unspecified), increased alanine aminotransferase (ALT), decreased phosphate, decreased hemoglobin, viral infection, increased gamma glutamyl transferase (GGT), musculoskeletal pain, increased lipase, fatigue, increased amylase, increased calcium, increased creatine phosphokinase (CPK), increased alkaline phosphatase (ALP), nausea, headache, diarrhea, cough, bacterial infection, pyrexia, and dyspnea.

== History ==
Efficacy was evaluated in AGAVE-201 (NCT04710576), a randomized, open-label, multicenter trial investigating three dosages of axatilimab in people with recurrent or refractory chronic graft-versus-host disease who had received at least two lines of systemic therapy and required additional treatment. Axatilimab was evaluated in an open-label single arm clinical trial of 79 participants with chronic graft-versus-host disease who had received at least two prior systemic treatments and required additional treatment. All participants received axatilimab 0.3 mg/kg every two weeks, until chronic graft-versus-host disease progression or unacceptable toxicity. The US Food and Drug Administration (FDA) approved axatilimab based on evidence of safety and efficacy from a clinical trial which included a total of 79 participants with chronic graft-versus-host disease after failure of two prior lines of systemic therapy. The trial was conducted at 55 sites in 13 countries, including Australia, Belgium, Canada, Germany, Greece, France, Israel, Italy, Spain, South Korea, Taiwan, the United Kingdom, and the United States. There were 24 sites in the United States. Out of 79 participants, at the approved dose of 0.3 mg/kg every two weeks, 37 participants were enrolled in the United States, and 43 participants at the trial sites outside of the United States.

The FDA granted the application for axatilimab orphan drug and fast track designations for the treatment of chronic graft-versus-host disease.

== Society and culture ==
=== Legal status ===
Axatilimab was approved for medical use in the United States in August 2024.

=== Names ===
Axatilimab is the international nonproprietary name.

Axatilimab is sold under the brand name Niktimvo.
