= Mesoblast =

Australian pharmaceutical company

Mesoblast Limited
- Type: Public
- Traded as: ASX: MSB; Nasdaq: MESO
- Industry: Pharmaceuticals
- Founded: 2004; 22 years ago
- Founder: Silviu Itescu
- Headquarters: 55 Collins Street, Melbourne, Australia
- Key people: Jane Bell (chair); Silviu Itescu (CEO)
- Revenue: ▲US$17.2 million (2025)
- Net income: ▼US$−102 million (2025)
- Total assets: ▲US$785 million (2025)
- Total equity: ▲US$597 million (2025)
- Number of employees: 81 (2025)
- Website: www.mesoblast.com

Mesoblast Limited is an Australian regenerative medicine company. It seeks to provide treatments for inflammatory ailments, cardiovascular disease, and back pain. The company is led by Silviu Itescu, who founded the company in 2004.

== History ==
In Mesoblast's annual report from August 2010, the company first announced positive results of preclinical trials showing radiographic and pathologic disc regeneration with MPC-06-ID. Mesoblast said they were in the process of completing an Investigational New Drug (IND) submission to the United States Food and Drug Administration to commence Phase 2 clinical trials. In December 2010, Mesoblast entered into an agreement with U.S.-based Cephalon to develop and commercialize novel adult Mesenchymal Precursor Stem Cell (MPC) therapeutics for degenerative conditions of the cardiovascular and central nervous systems.

In September 2011, Mesoblast entered into an agreement with Swiss-based Lonza Group. Under the agreement, Lonza will manufacture the stem cells for Mesoblast's MPC cell products. Mesoblast will also have exclusive access to Lonza's Cell Therapy facilities in Singapore for the manufacture of allogeneic cell therapies. In May 2014, Mesoblast announced it would receive incentives from the Singapore Economic Development Board (EDB) for activities in Singapore related to manufacturing operations, product development, and commercialization.

Osiris Therapeutics, a pharmaceutical company, sold its stem cell business and its related patents to Mesoblast in 2013. In March 2014, Circulation Journal published the results of a clinical trial using MPCs as adjunctive therapy for patients with a Ventricular Assist Device.

On February 10, 2015, Mesoblast was granted a patent by the United States Patent and Trademark Office (USPTO) covering its proprietary Mesenchymal Precursor Cell (MPC) technology for use in the treatment of degenerated intervertebral discs. In June 2015, Mesoblast received $5.8 million from the Australian Government for Research and Development (R&D) activities conducted during the 2014 financial year. The funds were provided to Mesoblast under the Government's R&D Tax Incentive Program.

In February 2016, Mesoblast's licensee, JCR Pharmaceuticals Co., Ltd., began marketing its MSC drug, Ryoncil, under the trade name TEMCELL. The company sold it as an allogeneic cell product for the treatment of acute graft versus host disease (aGVHD) in children and adults in Japan. TEMCELL is the first allogeneic cell therapy to be fully approved in Japan. In December 2016, Mesoblast and Mallinckrodt Pharmaceuticals entered into an agreement to exclusively negotiate a commercial and development partnership for MPC-06-ID in the treatment of chronic low back pain due to disc degeneration. In June 2024, the company resubmitted a Biologics License Application with the FDA Ryoncil (TEMCELL) to treat children with steroid-refractory acute graft-versus-host disease (SR-aGVHD); in July of the same year, the government agency accepted the application. A Phase III clinical trial began enrollment on July 22, 2024, of rexlemestrocel-L for patients with chronic low back pain caused by inflammatory degenerative disc disease.

In December 2024, Mesoblast received regenerative medicine advanced therapy designation (RMAT) from the FDA for its drug Revascor (Rexlemestrocel-L) to treat children with regenerative heart disease.

== Research ==
=== Mesenchymal lineage cells ===
Mesoblast products are largely derived from its proprietary mesenchymal lineage cells. This includes Mesenchymal Precursor Cells (MPCs) and Mesenchymal Stem Cells (MSCs).

=== Focus areas ===
- Graft-versus-Host Disease: a complication that may occur after an allogeneic transplant.
- Back pain: Mesoblast's investigational product candidate MPC-06-ID is being tested in a Phase III clinical trial.
- Rheumatoid Arthritis: On March 24, 2016 US patent 9,265,796 was granted for the use of Mesenchymal Precursor Cells (MPCs)for the treatment or prevention of rheumatic conditions, including rheumatoid arthritis, osteoarthritis, psoriatic arthritis, ankylosing spondylitis, sacroiliitis, enteric arthritis, and reactive arthritis.
- Crohn's disease: A trial was announced to evaluate Ryoncil in moderate to severe Crohn's Disease.
- Diabetic nephropathy: Mesoblast presented the results of a trial involving product candidate MPC-300-IV at the late-breaking scientific sessions of the 75th annual meeting of the American Diabetes Association.
- COVID-19 Acute Respiratory Distress Symptoms: In 2020, Ryoncil was tested on late-stage, ventilator-assisted COVID-19 patients with Acute Respiratory Distress Syndrome in the United States.

== Criticism ==
Mesoblast's solution for back pain was criticized by competitor Regenexx in August 2015. Dr. Chris Centeno said the trial results contained confusing and misleading language, press releases for phases 1 and 2 did not include images of MRIs to prove that discs were regenerated and Centeno expressed doubts about mass producing cell quality. He also stated that the host's immune system removes the injected stem cells.

== Financial performance ==
Mesoblast is listed as MSB on the Australian Securities Exchange (ASX), as MESO on the NASDAQ, and as MEOBF on the ATC Markets.

The company reported its financial results in June 2024.

- Cash on hand was $63.0 million.
- Net loss $88.0 million.
- As of June 30, 2024 the company's total assets were $669.2 million.
