= Arnold Caplan =

American biologist (1942–2024)

Arnold I. Caplan
- Born: Arnold Irving Caplan; January 5, 1942; Chicago, Illinois, United States
- Died: January 10, 2024 (aged 82); Cleveland, Ohio, United States
- Education: Illinois Institute of Technology (B.S.), Johns Hopkins University School of Medicine (Ph.D.)
- Known for: Discovery and characterization of mesenchymal stem cells (MSCs)
- Awards: Marshall R. Urist Award, TERMIS Lifetime Achievement Award, Case Western Reserve University Faculty Innovator Award
- Scientific career
- Fields: Regenerative medicine, stem cell biology, tissue engineering
- Workplaces: Case Western Reserve University

Arnold Irving Caplan (January 5, 1942 – January 10, 2024) was an American stem cell biologist and professor at Case Western Reserve University. His research involved clinical applications of mesenchymal stem cells (MSCs) in treating human diseases.

== Early life and education ==
Arnold Irving Caplan was born on January 5, 1942, in Chicago, Illinois.

He earned his Bachelor of Science (B.S.) degree in Chemistry from the Illinois Institute of Technology and completed his Ph.D. in Biochemistry at Johns Hopkins University School of Medicine.

== Career ==
Caplan joined Case Western Reserve University as an assistant professor in 1969, and was promoted to professor in 1981. He served as the founding director of the university's Skeletal Research Center. He held secondary appointments at the School of Engineering and the School of Medicine.

His primary research focus was the clinical application of mesenchymal stem cells (MSCs) to treating human diseases. Caplan performed research involving isolating MSCs from adult bone marrow in the late 1980s. This research helped demonstrate MSCs' ability to modulate the immune system, inhibit programmed cell death and scar formation stimulate blood vessel formation, and promote tissue-specific stem cell growth.

His work impacted treatments for multiple sclerosis, osteoarthritis, spinal cord injuries, cancer, and other conditions. Caplan authored over 400 scientific papers and held more than 20 patents related to MSC technology. He trained over 150 researchers during his career.

In 1992, he founded Osiris Therapeutics, a medical research company that commercialized MSC technology. Osiris Therapeutics became one of the first companies to develop allogeneic cell therapies and achieved regulatory clearance for a stem cell drug in 2012.

== Awards and honors ==
Caplan received the following accolades during his career:

- Marshall R. Urist Award for Excellence in Tissue Regeneration Research
- TERMIS Lifetime Achievement Award
- Case Western Reserve University Faculty Innovator Award
- Regenerative Medicine Foundation's Stem Cell Action Lifetime Achievement Award (2022)

== Personal life ==
Arnold Caplan was married to Bonnie Caplan for 58 years. They had two children and 6 grandchildren.
