= CellResearch Corporation =

- Industry: Biotechnology, Stem Cell Technology
- Founded: 2002
- Founders: Phan Toan Thang (CSO), Gavin Tan (CEO), Ivor Lim (CMO)
- Headquarters: Singapore
- Products: Skin care, Cosmetics, Cord Tissue banking
- Website: cellresearchcorp.com

CellResearch Corporation is a biotechnology company with a primary focus on skin cell and cord lining stem cell research. CellResearch has one of the world's largest private skin-, scar-, and keloid-cell libraries which have been used for research by cell culture laboratories worldwide, including those at Harvard University, Procter & Gamble and Johnson & Johnson. It owns 39 patents worldwide with intellectual property for the isolation of stem cells from the umbilical cord lining membrane of all mammals, which also includes the banking and cultivation of these cells, as well as the therapeutic applications of these cells.

The firm was founded in 2002 by Phan Toan Thang, Ivor Lim and Gavin Tan and originally sold skin cell samples for research. In 2014, it was reported that the company was worth $640 million.

== Operations ==
In 2004, Phan found two unique kinds of stem cells from the outer lining membrane of the umbilical cord. The umbilical cord lining can yield 6 billion epithelial and 6 billion mesenchymal stem cells from a primary explant in one generation. In comparison, the bone marrow produces a few million mesenchymal stem cells per bone marrow aspiration.

Initial studies focused on wound healing. In 2015, the firm began developing current Good Manufacturing Practice (cGMP) grade cord lining mesenchymal stem cells, which could be used for human transplantation. The stem cell product, called CorLiCyte, was approved for a USFDA trial to heal diabetic wounds, to be completed around 2018-2019. The firm also developed the skincare product CALECIM, made from red deer umbilical cord lining extract, which comprises secreted cell proteins integrated into a cream and serum cosmetic product.

CordLabs licenses its proprietary cord lining stem cell storage technology to cord blood banks, allowing them to also bank cord tissue from which the cord lining stem cells are derived.
