= STRO-1 =

STRO-1 (Stro-1 in mouse, rat, etc.) is a gene for a protein marker of mesenchymal stem cells (MSC). Molecular mass of Stro-1 is 75kD. The name STRO-1 is firstly proposed in the 1990s' as the name of an anti-CD34+-mesenchymal-stem-cell monoclonal antibody. The name "STRO-1" consists of STRO, which means mesenchyme, and "1", which means it's the first isolated monoclonal antibody to identify mesenchymal stem cells. The term "STRO-1" then was applied to the antigen for this antibody. In human body, STRO-1 exists in many organs, like lung and liver.

== See also ==
- Mesenchymal stem cells (MSC)
