= Remestemcel =

Pharmacologic substance

Clinical data
- Trade names: Ryoncil
- Other names: JR-0301, remestemcel-L-rknd, remestemcel-L (USAN US)
- License data: US DailyMed: Remestemcel
- Routes of administration: Intravenous
- ATC code: None

Legal status
- Legal status: US: ℞-only

Identifiers
- DrugBank: DB13973
- UNII: H57D26Z9YK
- KEGG: D09719

Remestemcel, sold under the brand name Ryoncil, is an allogeneic bone marrow-derived mesenchymal stromal cell therapy used for the treatment of graft-versus-host disease. Remestemcel contains mesenchymal stromal cells, which are a type of cell that can have various roles in the body and can differentiate into multiple other types of cells. These mesenchymal stromal cell are isolated from the bone marrow of healthy adult human donors.

The most common adverse reactions include viral infectious disorders, bacterial infectious disorders, infection – pathogen unspecified, pyrexia, hemorrhage, edema, abdominal pain, and hypertension.

Remestemcel was approved for medical use in the United States in December 2024. Remestemcel is the first mesenchymal stromal cell therapy approved by the US Food and Drug Administration.

== Medical uses ==
Remestemcel is indicated for the treatment of steroid-refractory acute graft-versus-host disease.

== History ==
The safety and effectiveness of remestemcel were evaluated in a multicenter, single-arm study in 54 pediatric study participants with steroid-refractory acute graft-versus-host disease after undergoing allogeneic hematopoietic (blood) stem cell transplantation. Study participants received intravenous infusion of remestemcel twice weekly for four consecutive weeks, for a total of eight infusions. Each study participant's condition at baseline was analyzed using the international blood and marrow transplantation registry severity index criteria (IBMTR) to evaluate which organs have been affected and the overall severity of the disease. The effectiveness of remestemcel was based primarily on the rate and duration of response to treatment 28 days after initiating remestemcel. Study participants who had a partial or mixed response to treatment—meaning that there was improved condition in one organ with either no change (partial) or worsening condition (mixed) in another organ—received additional infusions once weekly for an additional four weeks. Sixteen study participants (30%) had a complete response to treatment 28 days after receiving remestemcel, while 22 study participants (41%) had a partial response.

The US Food and Drug Administration (FDA) granted the application for remestemcel fast track, orphan drug, and priority review designations. The FDA granted approval of Ryoncil to Mesoblast, Inc.

== Society and culture ==
=== Legal status ===
Remestemcel was approved for medical use in the United States in December 2024.

=== Names ===
Remestemcel is the international nonproprietary name.

Remestemcel-L is the United States Adopted Name.
