= Dental papilla =

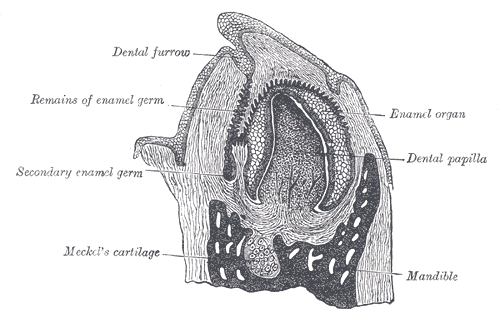
- Vertical section of the mandible of an early human fetus. × 25. (Dental papilla labeled at center right.)

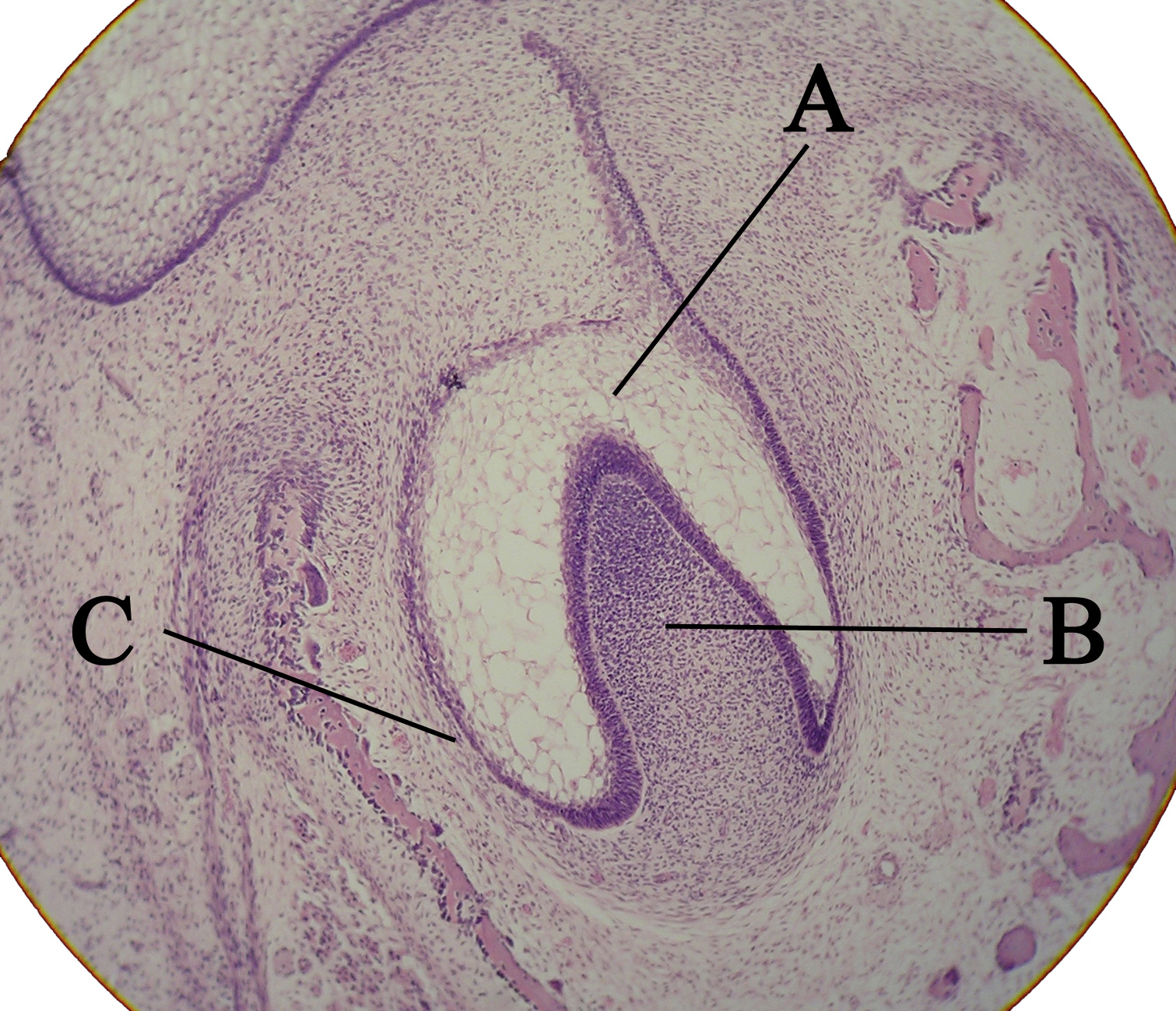
- Histologic slide showing a tooth bud. A: enamel organ B: dental papilla C: dental follicle

Details

Identifiers
- Latin: papilla dentis
- MeSH: D003771
- TA98: A05.1.03.054
- TE: papilla_by_E4.0.3.3.1.0.12 E4.0.3.3.1.0.12
- FMA: 57662

In embryology and prenatal development, the dental papilla is a condensation of ectomesenchymal cells called odontoblasts, seen in histologic sections of a developing tooth. It lies below a cellular aggregation known as the enamel organ. The dental papilla appears after 8–10 weeks of intra uteral life. The dental papilla gives rise to the dentin and pulp of a tooth.

The enamel organ, dental papilla, and dental follicle together forms one unit, called the tooth germ. This is of importance because all the tissues of a tooth and its supporting structures form from these distinct cellular aggregations. Similar to dental follicle, the dental papilla has a very rich blood supply and provides nutrition to the enamel organ.

== Embryology ==
Formation of dental papilla occurs in the cap stage of odontogenesis.

=== Cap stage ===
The cap stage is the second stage of tooth development and occurs during the ninth or tenth week of prenatal development. Unequal proliferation of the tooth bud forms a three-dimensional cap shape. Overlying this cap structure is the ectomesenchyme, which is attached to the mesodermal tissue known as the dental papilla superiorly, and lies within the epithelial concavity.

Various types of differentiation occur at this stage; such as cytodifferentiation, histodifferentiation and morphodifferentiation. Histodifferentiation is the differentiation of different tissue types during the development of an embryo/ undifferentiated group of cells. Furthermore, morphogenesis is a predominant physiological process during the cap stage. This is due to formation of primordium of the tooth. The primordium contains each of the primordial tissue types, essential for the development of successive teeth. These primordial tissues together form the enamel organ, dental papilla and dental sac.

Also during the cap stage is the formation of a depression within the deepest part of each tooth bud of the dental lamina. The dental lamina is a band of epithelial tissue which connects the developing tooth bud to the oral epithelium. The dental lamina eventually disintegrates into small clusters of epithelium and is reabsorbed. The dental lamina is first evidence of tooth development and begins at the sixth week in utero.

This is responsible for the cap-like structure of the enamel organ. Enamel is an ectodermal product, as it is originally derived from ectoderm which is the outermost of the three germ layers of the forming embryo. The other two are: the mesoderm and the endoderm. It gives rise to the nervous system, sense organs, outer layer of the skin, teeth and the membrane lining the oral cavity (mouth).

A section of the ectomesenchyme (a group of tissue made up of neurocrest cells which are present in the initial development of an embryo. This forms the hard and soft tissues of the neck and skull), condenses into a mass within the concavity of the cap of the enamel organ. This mass is now considered the dental papilla. Note that dental papilla is originally derived from ectomesenchyme. Ectomesenchyme (type of mesenchyme) is derived from neural crest cells (NCCs). A basement membrane exists between the enamel organ and dental papilla which will be the site of the future dentinoenamel junction. The dentinoenamel junction is the surface at which the enamel and the dentin of the crown of a tooth are joined.

The existing ectomesenchyme around the outside of the cap of the enamel organ then condenses into the dental sac. A basement membrane separate the enamel organ and the dental sac. The dental sac produces the periodontium in future development. The periodontium is the tissue that surrounds and supports the teeth. It includes the connective tissue and overlying keratinised membrane lining the oral cavity that surrounds the teeth, the periodontal ligament, cementum which provides a protective covering for the root surface and supporting alveolar bone.

=== Bell stage ===
The bell stage is the fourth stage of tooth development which occurs between the eleventh and twelfth week of prenatal development. During this stage of odontogenesis, the epithelial tooth germ forms a bell-shaped structure in the labio-lingual section and is characterised by the formation of the dental sac. The peripheral cells of the dental papilla undergo differentiation, growing larger in size and taking a columnar (uni-layered) form and are now referred to as odontoblasts (the outer part of the dental pulp). This differentiation begins at the apex of the dental papilla, gradually extending downwards. This differentiation occurs to supplement the development of the dental sac which is responsible for cementum, periodontal ligament and the alveolar process.

==== Epithelium layers ====
- Inner
  - Separated from the peripheral cells of the dental papilla by a basement membrane and a cell free zone
  - Rich in RNA but do not contain alkaline phosphatase
- Outer
  - Involved in the maintenance of the shape of the enamel and the environment
  - Contain very big nuclei and have small quantities of the intra-cellular organelles involved in protein synthesis. The cells contact each other through desmosomes and gap junctions
- Stratum
  - Is concerned with:
    - the synthesis of proteins
    - the transport of materials to and from the enamel-forming cells in the internal enamel epithelium
    - the concentration of materials

=== Apposition stage and maturation stage ===
During the apposition stage, the enamel, dentin and cementum are secreted in successive layers. The mesenchymal tissue of dental papilla and dental sac and the ectodermal tissue of enamel undergo induction. The outer cells of dental papilla are induced by preameloblasts (cells within the enamel from which a cell that takes part in forming dental enamel develops) to differentiate into odontoblasts (dentin-secreting cells). The odontoblasts undergo differentiation and repolarization and result in formation of the dentin matrix/pre-dentin (the innermost section of the dentin, which is not mineralized and located adjacent to pulp tissues in the crown area and root area). The central cells of dental papilla form the primordium of the pulp during root development. These cells then become surrounded by newly formed dentin.

== Differentiation ==
Ectomesenchymal cells will multiply continuously in a localized area such that when the bell stage of development is reached, both the epithelial component and the ectomesenchymal component will seem to have been surrounded by something that presents as a fibrous sac. Therefore, among a complicated mass of highly differentiated cells, it would appear to have three major components, which are:

1. The dental follicle → The ectomesenchymal cells which are part of the fibrous sac that have been formed
2. The dental papilla → The ectomesenchymal cells which are lying deep to the enamel organ
3. The enamel organ → purely the epithelial component

The tissues which have been derived from each of the three components are:

1. The dental follicle → will develop to become the periodontal ligament, the cementum and the alveolar bone
2. The dental papilla → will develop to become the dental pulp and the dentine
3. The enamel organ → will develop to create the enamel solely

Till this point, no dental tissues have been created yet.

When all of the individual components of the tooth germ have become developed, the entire cell mass would have appeared to have migrated deeper into the underlying connective tissues. This phenomenon, which will continue throughout the whole life of the teeth, is most possibly due to the cell mass moving towards a rich blood supply that can be found in the deeper parts of the mandible (lower jaw) and the maxilla (upper jaw) The probable need for a rich blood supply would seem to show that the cell mass will soon be highly productive in the formation of dental tissues. Therefore, when the late bell stage of the tooth germ development has been reached, most of the cells would have been differentiated to an apparent endpoint where the cells will now begin their formative role when the first three stages of the tissue development are almost completed, and the tissues can now start to begin secreting.

== Nerve and vascular supply during early development ==
=== Vascular supply ===
Clusters of blood vessels are found branching out around the tooth germ in the dental follicle and going into the dental papilla during the cap stage. In the dental papilla the number of blood vessels increase and the matrix deposition will begin once the maximum is reached during the bell stage. Blood vessels going into the dental papilla are formed into groups that coincides with the positions of where the roots will develop in future. As time passes, the viability of the tissue is affected as the blood supply becomes steadily reduced in stages and the volume of pulpal tissue starts decreasing too.

=== Nerve supply ===
During the bud to cap stage of tooth development, the pioneer nerve fibers head towards the developing tooth. The nerve fibers will branch out and create a rich plexus around the tooth germ in that structure as the dental follicle is the clear target of these dental nerve fibers. The dental follicle is a fibrous sac that surrounds the odontogenic organ and developing tooth. The plexus is a system of connections of blood vessels, nerves, or lymphatic vessels. The plexus of Raschkow is a network of nerves immediately beneath the odontoblast layer of the dentine, first described by J. Raschkow in 1835. However, the nerve fibers will only begin entering the dental papilla (pulp) when dentinogenesis starts. The timing is not similar to the establishment of the neural supply and the papillary vascular supply even though a feasible relationship has been assumed between the developing nerve and blood supplies. Furthermore, histo-chemistry studies have shown that in the makeup of pioneer nerve fibers heading towards the tooth germ, automatic nerve fibers are not present. Therefore, the starting innervation of the developing teeth is involved with the sensory innovation of the future periodontal ligament and pulp. Nerve fibers never enters the enamel organ.

Nerve-related signaling molecules, such as glial cell line-derived growth factor, neurotrophin and semaphorin are among the few which have been studied during the tooth development process. Of which, the verve-related signaling molecules seems to show a trend that suggest an early implication of innervation of tooth development. Similar to how many molecules are able to stimulate axonal growth or migration, various molecules are also within the bounds of possibility of being involved in the initial innervation of the tooth germ.

== Odontoblast differentiation ==
Understanding how odontoblast differentiate from ectomesenchymal cells allows comprehension and explanation of normal development and affects their recruitment when needed to start repairing the dentin.

Growth factors in the cells of the inner enamel epithelium and expressions of signaling molecules bring about the differentiation of odontoblast through normal development of the dental papilla. Exhibiting a central nucleus and few organelles, the dental papilla cells are small and undifferentiated. At this stage, the cells are separated by an acellular zone, that consist of some fine collagen fibrils, from the inner enamel epithelium. Changes will also start occurring in the adjacent dental papilla, very quickly after reversed polarity of the cells of the inner enamel epithelium. To contain increasing amounts of protein-synthesizing organelles, odontoblasts as their cytoplasm (the liquid inside a cell but outside the nucleus). increases in volume after the ectomesenchymal cells beside the acellular zone rapidly enlarge and elongate to become preodontoblasts. When the odontoblasts differentiate and increase in size to occupy the acellular zone between the dental papilla and the inner enamel epithelium, the zone slowly is removed. With their nuclei positioned away from the inner enamel epithelium, these newly differentiated cells are distinguished by being highly polarized.

== See also ==
- Tooth development proceeds into three stages: the bud, cap and bell stage. these terms are descriptive of the morphology of the developing tooth germ but do not describe the significant functional changes that occur during development, such as morphogenesis and histodifferentiation.
