= Amniotic epithelial cell =

Form of stem cell in the lining of the inner membrane of the placenta

An amniotic epithelial cell is a form of stem cell extracted from the lining of the inner membrane of the placenta. Amniotic epithelial cells start to develop around 8 days post fertilization. These cells are known to have some of the same markers as embryonic stem cells, more specifically, Oct-4 and nanog. These transcription factors are the basis of the pluripotency of stem cells. Amniotic epithelial cells have the ability to develop into any of the three germ layers: endoderm, mesoderm, and ectoderm. They can develop into several organ tissues specific to these germ layers including heart, brain, and liver. The pluripotency of the human amniotic epithelial cells makes them useful in treating and fighting diseases and disorders of the nervous system as well as other tissues of the human body. Artificial heart valves and working tracheas, as well as muscle, fat, bone, heart, neural and liver cells have all been engineered using amniotic stem cells. Tissues obtained from amniotic cell lines show promise for patients with congenital diseases or malformations of the heart, liver, lungs, kidneys, and cerebral tissue.

== Transplantation ==
Amniotic epithelial cells have shown to be safe and successfully transplanted into hosts that are not related to the donor. One possible reason for this is that amniotic epithelial cells have low antigen levels that inhibit compatibility from a donor to the recipient. This makes the possibility of rejection of the cells by the recipient tissue less likely. Unlike traditional tissue transplants, where the donor and recipient have to be in complete sync as far as blood type and overall compatibility and even still can show tissue rejection, amniotic epithelial cells can be used and show a higher likelihood of tissue acceptance. Also, amniotic epithelial cells are known to promote natural wound healing as well as the inhibition of angiogenesis, which is the basic conversion of a tumor into malignant cancer.

== Advantages over embryonic stem cells ==
In harvesting embryonic stem cells, a human embryo is destroyed. Many anti-abortion individuals associate this act with abortion and consider it immoral. Amniotic epithelial cells are harvested from the placenta, which is commonly discarded after birth. The cells are very easily obtainable without the use of intrusive procedures. Thus their use averts the controversy about embryonic stem cells. There are also large amounts of amniotic epithelial cells found in the placenta and can be found in upwards of 50-100 million cells from one extraction. However, several billion cells are required to use for transplantation in order to treat and fight diseases. Therefore, the cells must be expanded in a lab to have enough cells for transplantation.

Unlike embryonic stem cells, amniotic stem cells have not shown a propensity for developing into teratomas and other cancer-like tumors upon injection into living tissue. Amniotic epithelial cells have not been known to produce cancerous tumors in the host despite the fact that these cells do express genes found in embryonic stem cells that are known to promote tumor formation.

Organs engineered from amniotic epithelial cells obtained from the placenta associated with a particular person's birth would not be rejected by that person; such organs would have the same genotype as that person and thus be fully compatible with that person's immune system.

== Expansion ==
Because there is not a sufficient amount of amniotic epithelial cells extracted from a single term placenta to be use in cellular therapies, the cells must be expanded in a lab. However, some studies have shown that once these cells are duplicated in the lab, some of the pluripotency is lost. Also, these lab grown cells have shown altered gene expression causing a differing phenotype as well as differing antigen levels. This may change their ability to be compatible across non related tissues. Much of the effects of expanding these cells are unknown and scientists are continuing to study ways to cultivate these cells without changing their pluripotent properties. Scientists have found that freezing amniotic epithelial cells causes them to not function as they normally would, which have scientists thinking that the extracellular matrix is the part of the cell that controls its functions.

== Cellular therapies ==
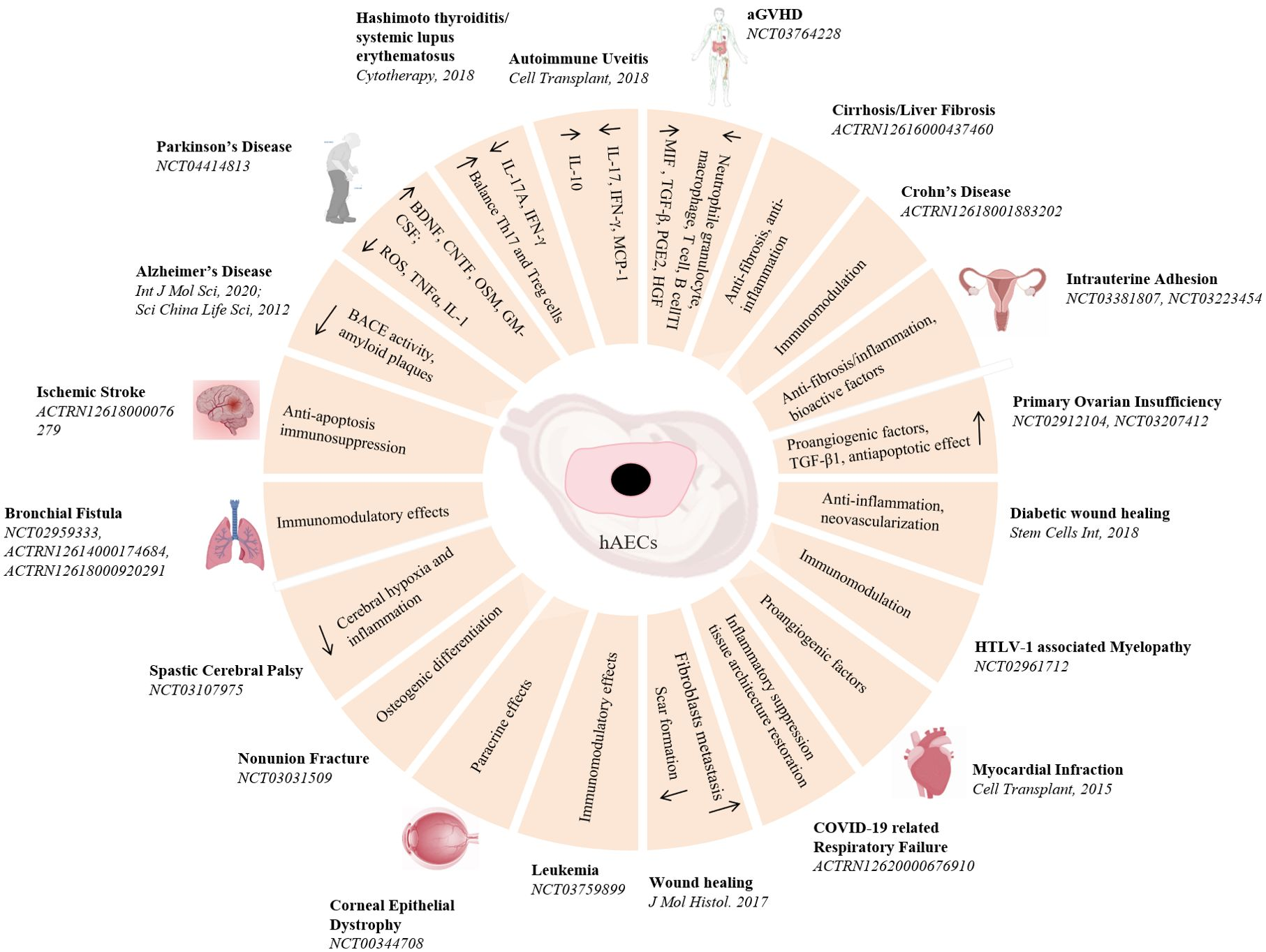
Pre-clinical and clinical studies of hAECs on diseases treatment. A schematic overview of hAECs on various diseases treatment and the underlying potential mechanisms.

There have been several studies conducted on the potential benefits of using amniotic epithelial cells in various parts of the body. One prospective use of these cells includes cellular therapies aimed at dropping inflammation and scarring. Models have shown that using these cells to reduce such inflammation has shown rewarding affects in the lungs and liver. More specifically, amniotic epithelial cells have been used in the past to treat genetic liver diseases such as ornithine transcarbamylase deficiency, familial hypercholesterolemia, and Crigler–Najjar syndrome. These cells are being looked at by scientists as a new and more efficient way to treat diseases of the liver particularly because of the problem arising from a lack of liver donors. Scientists are also working with genetically modified human amniotic epithelial cells in new experimental procedures and cellular therapies.

Also, amniotic epithelial cells have shown potential for encouraging tissue repair of the recipient. Studies have shown that the use of amniotic epithelial cells in cellular therapies involving spinal cord injuries is promising because of their ability to differentiate into fully operational neurons and can release neurotransmitters. These cells can also be used to treat diseases that affect the central nervous system as well as other neurological disorders.

Amniotic epithelial cells are able to make and release acetylcholine and catecholamine. They also show gene expression for dopamine receptors and transporters. Because of this, they are also studied by scientists who research effects of new drugs on dopamine receptors and transporters as well as the basic functions including dopamine secretion and uptake. Several scientists have concluded using lab rats with Parkinson's disease that these cells, when transplanted, reversed the effects of the disease by replacing those dopamine releasing neurons that had died and prevented other neurons from being destroyed by the disease. Currently, Parkinson's disease is treated with dopamine replacement therapy but is not functional with the late progression of the disease and can't cure the disease. Also, other cells that have been used in the past for transplantation to treat Parkinson's, such as neural stem cells and embryonic stem cells, are either limited or controversial in their retrieval. Similar positive effects have also been shown in studies involving chickens with neurological disorders.

Experiments with lab mice have concluded that amniotic epithelial cells can also differentiate into cells of the pancreas that function to produce insulin and regulate blood sugar levels. This could be a possible cure or treatment for diabetes of both types.

These stem cells can also be used in the lung because they are able to differentiate into cells that produce surfactant, which promotes lung development in unborn fetuses. This could be used as treatment for babies born prematurely that have underdeveloped lung capacities. Another promising use of amniotic epithelial cells is to apply them to the cornea to restore its function in individuals with cornea failure. Studies have shown that when these cells are applied, it decreases the swelling of the ocular plane. Amniotic epithelial cells have also shown positive effects when used to treat severe burn victims by encouraging tissue repair of the recipient as well as treatment for certain autoimmune diseases.

Researchers from the Kyoto Prefectural University of Medicine recently conducted a study in which they transplanted amniotic epithelial cells into the oral cavity to treat oral mucosal defects. Because skin grafts taken from the oral cavity cause defects on the donor site, scientists were looking for a better way of treating these defects without creating defects from transplantation. These scientists used lab rabbits with the oral mucosal defects and transplanted cultured amniotic epithelial cells to the defected areas. The cultured amniotic epithelial cells showed markers found on the oral mucosal cells such as certain keratins. They found that the amniotic epithelial cells differentiation into mucosal-like cells and remained on the mucosal defect and therefore could be a possible mechanism for treating those defects. Scientists have recently discovered that human amniotic epithelial cells are able to produce and release the plasma protein albumin.
