= Odontoma =

Benign tumour of dental tissue

- Other names: Odontome
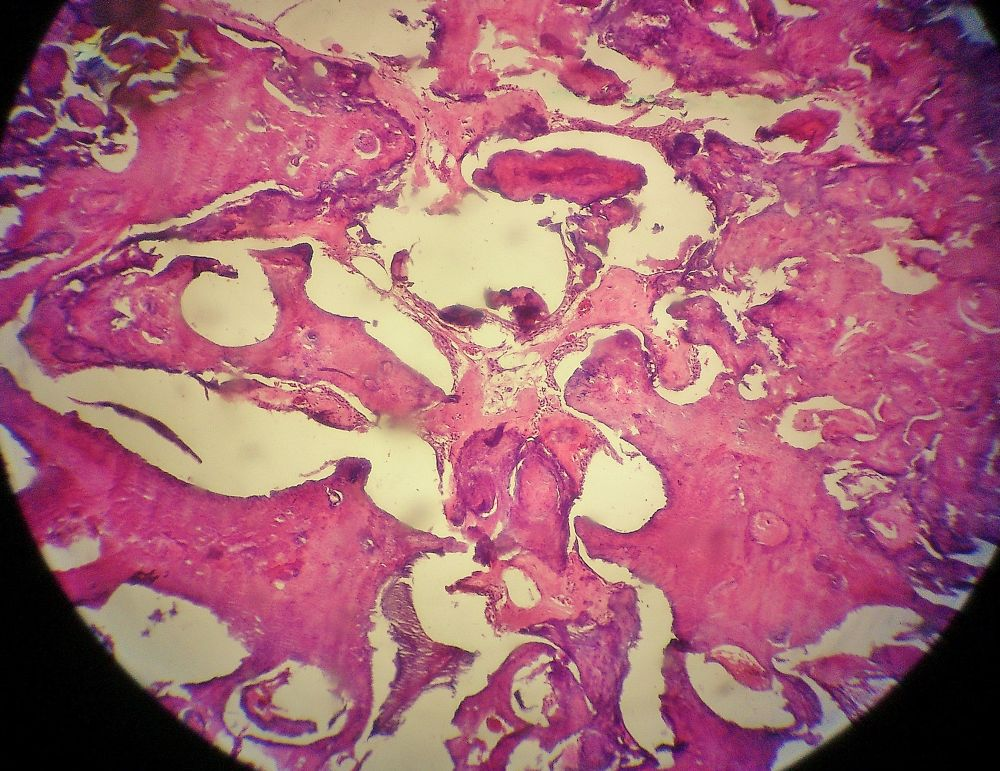
- Specialty: Dentistry

An odontoma, also known as an odontome, is a benign tumour linked to tooth development. Specifically, it is a dental hamartoma, meaning that it is composed of normal dental tissue that has grown in an irregular way. It includes both odontogenic hard and soft tissues. As with normal tooth development, odontomas stop growing once mature which makes them benign.

The average age of people found with an odontoma is 14. The condition is frequently associated with one or more unerupted teeth and is often detected through failure of teeth to erupt at the expected time. Though most cases are found impacted within the jaw there are instances where odontomas have erupted into the oral cavity.

== Types ==
There are two main types: compound and complex.

1. A compound (or composite) odontoma consists of the four separate dental tissues (enamel, dentine, cementum and pulp) embedded in fibrous connective tissue and surrounded by a fibrous capsule. It may present a lobulated appearance where there is no definitive demarcation of separate tissues between the individual "toothlets" (or denticles). Compound odontomas are usually found in the anterior maxilla and are less than 20 mm in diameter.
2. The complex type is unrecognizable as dental hard and soft tissues, usually presenting as a radioopaque area with varying densities indicating presence of enamel. It generally appears in the posterior mandible and can grow to be several centimetres in size.

In addition to the above forms, the dilated odontoma is an infrequent developmental alteration that appears in any area of the dental arches and can affect deciduous, permanent and supernumerary teeth. Dens invaginatus is a developmental anomaly resulting from invagination of a portion of crown forming within the enamel organ during odontogenesis. The most extreme form of dens invaginatus is known as a dilated odontoma.

There are two types of lesions which are regarded as complex odontomas with a prominent soft tissue component resembling ameloblastic fibroma. With similar presentation and treatment outcomes to complex odontomas. These lesions were poorly defined previously and were removed as separate entities from the WHO Classification of Head and Neck Tumors (2017). They are now regarded as developing odontomas as histologically there are no differences.

1. Ameloblastic fibrodentinoma with only dentine present
2. Ameloblastic fibro-odontoma with both enamel and dentine present

== Histopathology ==
Odontomas are from mixed epithelial and mesenchymal components which are required for tooth development, producing enamel, dentine, cementum and pulp tissue.

== Presentation ==
Odontomas usually asymptomatic and present as chance radiographic finding, often during childhood and adolescence when teeth do not erupt within the expected timeframe.

Occasionally odontomas can erupt into the mouth and this can lead to acute infections resembling a dental abscess.

During the early stage of odontoma development; radiolucent flecks develop. At a later stage of development a dense radioopaque mass becomes visible as enamel and dentine forms.

== Aetiology ==
Overall aetiology is unknown. However, odontomas have been related to local trauma, inflammatory and/or infectious processes, hereditary anomalies such as Gardener's syndrome and Hermanns syndrome, odontoblastic hyperactivity, mature odontoblasts and dental lamina remnants (Cell Rests of Serres).

=== Gardner's syndrome ===
Gardner's syndrome is a subtype of Familial adenomatous polyposis. The clinical presentation of this syndrome includes multiple odontomas. This condition has a high risk of malignancy through adenocarcinoma of the bowel.

== Treatment ==
Most common treatment is surgical enucleation due to well-encapsulated nature of odontomas allowing separation from surrounding bone.

If left untreated can result in a dentigerous cyst.

== Epidemiology ==
Odontomas are thought to be the second most frequent type of odontogenic tumor worldwide (after ameloblastoma), accounting for about 20% of all cases within this relatively uncommon tumor category which shows large geographic variations in incidence. According to the same article discussion, statistics might appear misleading as most of the odontomas within high-occurrence ameloblastoma-areas, are well-likely left unreported due to hospital management problems and asymptomatic clinical picture of odontoma.

Prior to 2014, the maximum recorded number of teeth removed in such an operation was 37. However, in July 2014 Ashiq Gavai, a 17-year-old boy in India, suffered from an extreme case of composite odontoma in his lower jaw, which required the removal of more than 232 teeth altogether. The surgery was performed by Dr. Sunanda Dhiware at Sir J. J. Hospital in Mumbai, India.

In 2019, a 7-year-old boy from Tiruvallur district, near Chennai, India with compound odontoma received surgery to remove 526 teeth from a "bag" in his lower right jaw. The surgery was performed at the hospital of Chennai.
