= Elafin =

Mammalian protein found in Homo sapiens

PI3
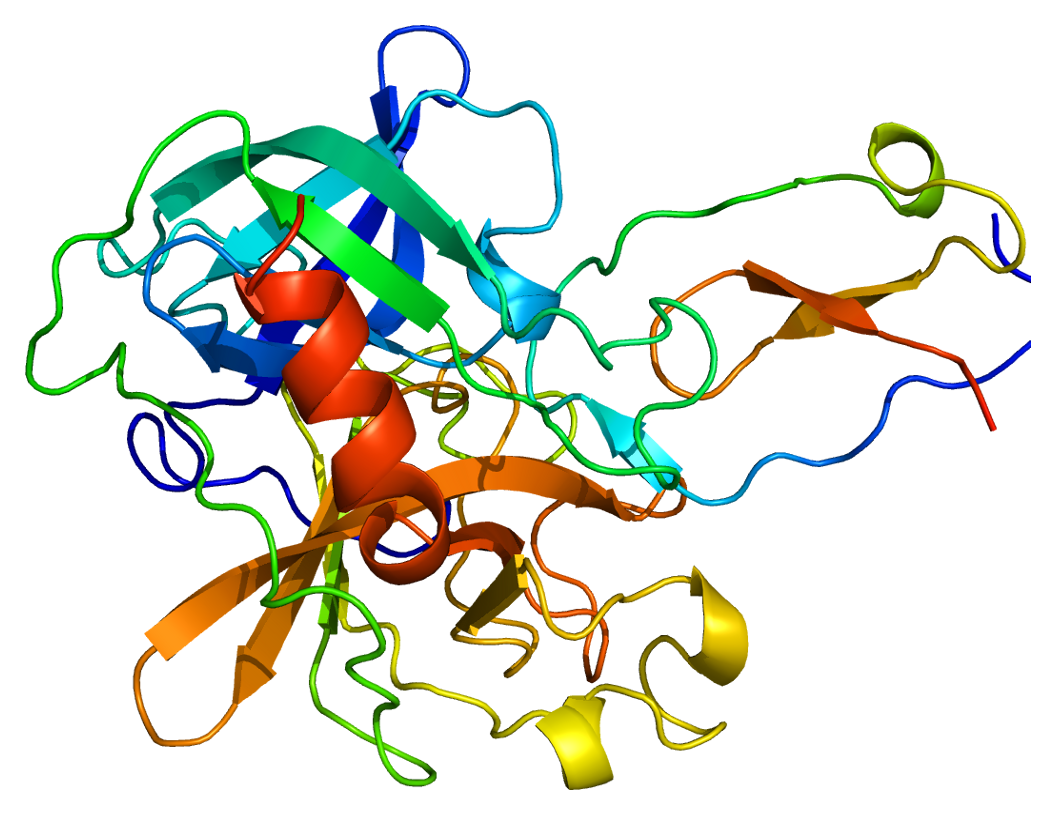

Identifiers
- Aliases: PI3, ESI, SKALP, WAP3, WFDC14, cementoin, peptidase inhibitor 3
- External IDs: OMIM: 182257; GeneCards: PI3
Available structures
PDB	Human UniProt search: PDBe RCSB
PDB	List of PDB id codes 1FLE, 2REL

Gene location (Human)
Chr.	Chromosome 20 (human)
Band	20q13.12	Start	45,174,902 bp
Band	20q13.12	End	45,176,544 bp
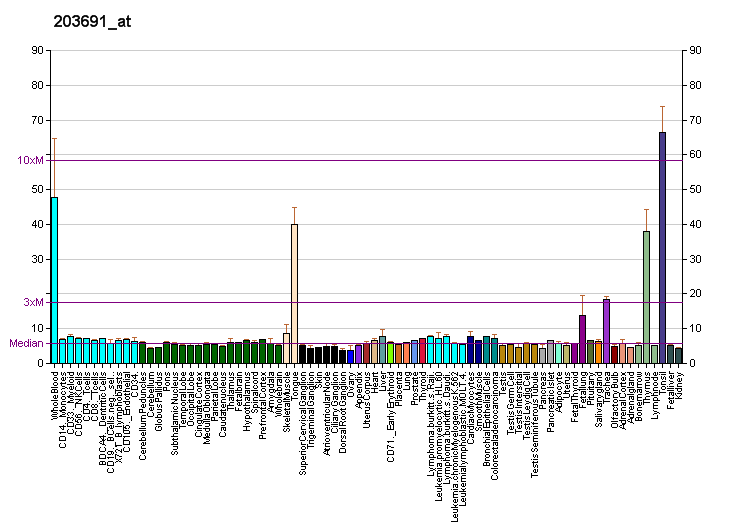

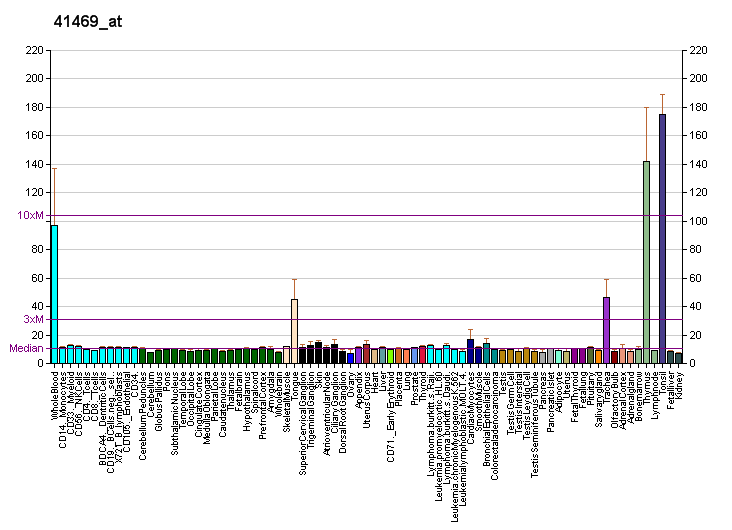
RNA expression pattern
Bgee	Human / Mouse (ortholog); Top expressed in: human penis; vulva; nasal epithelium; olfactory zone of nasal mucosa; gums; gingival epithelium; minor salivary glands; oral cavity; mucosa of pharynx; cervix epithelium / n/a; More reference expression data
BioGPS	More reference expression data
Gene ontology
Molecular function	peptidase inhibitor activity; endopeptidase inhibitor activity; serine-type endopeptidase inhibitor activity; structural constituent of skin epidermis
Cellular component	extracellular region; cytosol; cornified envelope; extracellular matrix
Biological process	negative regulation of peptidase activity; copulation; negative regulation of endopeptidase activity; antimicrobial humoral response; cornification; peptide cross-linking
Sources:Amigo / QuickGO
Orthologs
Databases	NCBI: entry; OMA: entry
Species	Human	Mouse
Entrez	5266	n/a
Ensembl	ENSG00000124102	n/a
UniProt	P19957	n/a
RefSeq (mRNA)	NM_002638	n/a
RefSeq (protein)	NP_002629	n/a
Location (UCSC)	Chr 20: 45.17 – 45.18 Mb	n/a
PubMed search		n/a
- Wikidata
View/Edit Human

Elafin, also known as peptidase inhibitor 3 or skin-derived antileukoprotease (SKALP), is a protein that in humans is encoded by the PI3 gene.

== Function ==
This gene encodes an elastase-specific protease inhibitor, which contains a WAP-type four-disulfide core (WFDC) domain, and is thus a member of the WFDC domain family. Most WFDC gene members are localized to chromosome 20q12-q13 in two clusters: centromeric and telomeric. This gene belongs to the centromeric cluster.

== Clinical significance ==
Elafin has been found to have utility in serving as a biomarker for graft versus host disease of the skin.

Elafin plays some role in gut inflammation.
