= Ectomesenchyme =

Type of embryonic tissue

Details

Identifiers
- Latin: ectomesenchyma; mesenchyma cristae neuralis
- TE: E4.0.4.1.0.0.53

Ectomesenchyme has properties similar to mesenchyme. The origin of the ectomesenchyme is disputed. It is either like the mesenchyme, arising from mesodermic cells, or conversely arising from neural crest cells. The neural crest is a critical group of cells that form in the cranial region during early vertebrate development. Ectomesenchyme plays a critical role in the formation of the hard and soft tissues of the head and neck, such as bones, muscles, teeth, and notably, the pharyngeal arches.
