= Mesenchymal stem cell =

Multipotent adult stem cells present in multiple tissues

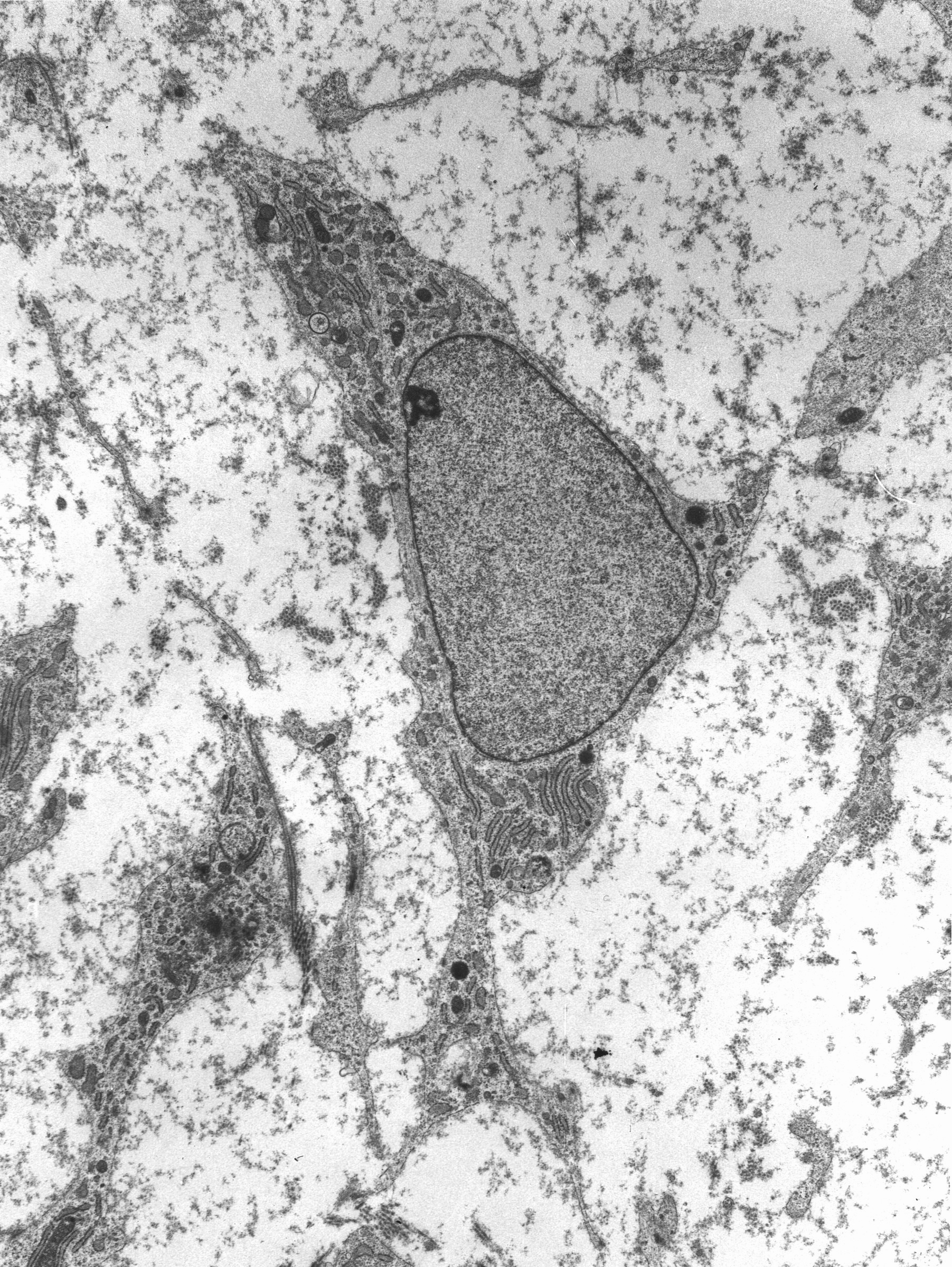
- Transmission electron micrograph of a mesenchymal stem cell displaying typical ultrastructural characteristics

Details

Identifiers
- Latin: cellula mesenchymatica praecursoria
- MeSH: D059630
- TH: H2.00.01.0.00008

Mesenchymal stem cells (MSCs), also known as mesenchymal stromal cells or medicinal signaling cells, are multipotent stromal cells that can differentiate into a variety of cell types, including osteoblasts (bone-making cells), chondrocytes (cartilage cells), myocytes (muscle cells) and adipocytes (fat cells which give rise to marrow adipose tissue).

The primary function of MSCs is to respond to injury and infection by secreting and recruiting a range of biological factors, as well as modulating inflammatory processes to facilitate tissue repair and regeneration. Extensive research interest has led to more than 80,000 peer-reviewed papers on MSCs.

== Structure ==
=== Definition ===
Mesenchymal stem cells (MSCs), a term first used (in 1991) by Arnold Caplan at Case Western Reserve University, are characterized morphologically by a small cell body with long, thin cell processes.

The International Society for Cellular Therapy has identified a few criteria to define mesenchymal stem cell (MSC):

1. MSC must be plastic-adherent when maintained in standard culture conditions.
2. MSC must express CD105, CD73 and CD90, and lack expression of CD45, CD34, CD14 or CD11b, CD79alpha or CD19 and HLA-DR surface molecules.
3. MSC must differentiate to osteoblasts, adipocytes and chondroblasts in vitro.

While the terms mesenchymal stem cell (MSC) and marrow stromal cell have been used interchangeably for many years, neither term is sufficiently descriptive:

- Mesenchyme is embryonic connective tissue that is derived from the mesoderm and that differentiates into hematopoietic and connective tissue, whereas MSCs do not differentiate into hematopoietic cells.
- Stromal cells are connective tissue cells that form the supportive structure in which the functional cells of the tissue reside. While this is an accurate description for one function of MSCs, the term fails to convey the relatively recently discovered roles of MSCs in the repair of tissue.
- The term encompasses multipotent cells derived from other non-marrow tissues, such as placenta, umbilical cord blood, adipose tissue, adult muscle, corneal stroma, or the dental pulp of deciduous (baby) teeth. The cells do not have the capacity to reconstitute an entire organ.
- Evidence shows that MSCs originate from progenitor perivascular cells called pericytes that reside on vessels.

=== Morphology ===
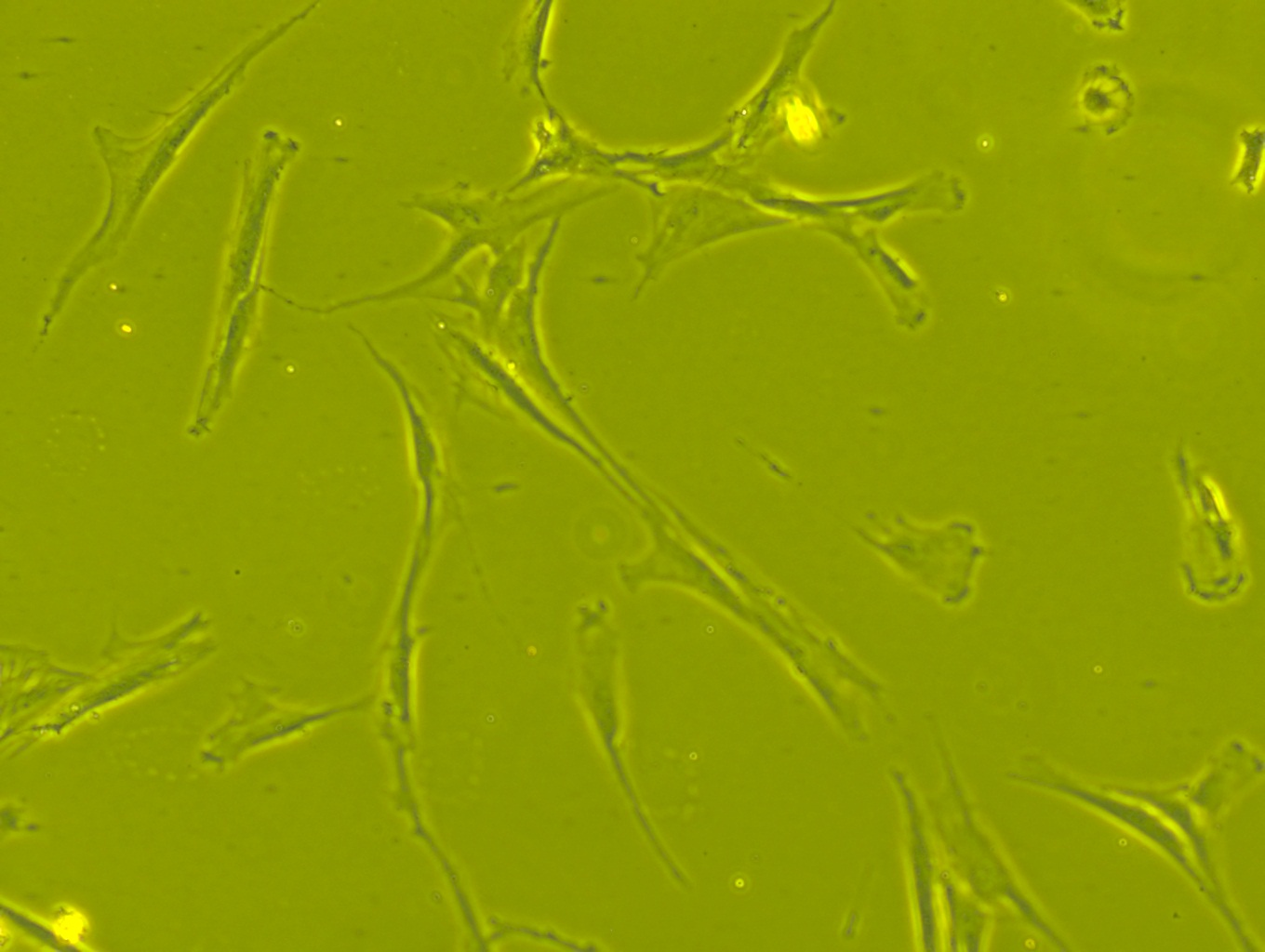
Human bone marrow-derived Mesenchymal stem cell showing fibroblast-like morphology seen under phase contrast microscope (Carl Zeiss Axiovert 40 CFL) at 63 x magnification

An example of human mesenchymal stem cells imaged with a live cell imaging microscope

The cell body contains a large, round nucleus with a prominent nucleolus, which is surrounded by finely dispersed chromatin particles, giving the nucleus a clear appearance. The remainder of the cell body contains a small amount of Golgi apparatus, rough endoplasmic reticulum, mitochondria, and polyribosomes. The cells, which are long and thin, are widely dispersed, and the adjacent extracellular matrix is populated by a few reticular fibrils, but is devoid of the other types of collagen fibrils. These distinctive morphological features of mesenchymal stem cells can be visualized label-free using live cell imaging.

=== Classification ===
Reviews have classified an MSC as having fibroblast-like structure, characterized by cell-surface markers and a potential to differentiate into bone, fat, or cartilage.

== Location in the body ==
MSCs are found throughout the human body.

=== Bone marrow ===
Bone marrow was the original source of MSCs, and is still the most frequently utilized source. These bone marrow stem cells do not contribute to the formation of blood cells, and so do not express the hematopoietic stem cell marker CD34. They are sometimes referred to as bone marrow stromal stem cells.

=== Cord cells ===
The youngest and most primitive MSCs may be obtained from umbilical cord tissue, namely Wharton's jelly and the umbilical cord blood. However, MSCs are found in much higher concentration in the Wharton's jelly compared to cord blood, which is a rich source of hematopoietic stem cells. The umbilical cord is available after a birth. It is normally discarded, and poses no risk for collection. These MSCs may prove to be a useful source of MSCs for clinical applications, due to their primitive properties and fast growth rate.

=== Adipose tissue ===
Adipose-tissue-derived MSCs (AdMSCs), in addition to being easier and safer to isolate than bone-marrow-derived MSCs, can be obtained in larger quantities.

=== Molar cells ===
The developing tooth bud of the mandibular third molar is a rich source of MSCs. While they are described as multipotent, it is possible that they are pluripotent. They eventually form enamel, dentin, blood vessels, dental pulp, and nervous tissues. These stem cells are capable of differentiating into chondrocytes, cardiomyocytes, melanocytes, and hepatocyte‐like cells in vitro.

=== Amniotic fluid ===
Stem cells are present in amniotic fluid. As many as 1 in 100 cells collected during amniocentesis are pluripotent mesenchymal stem cells.

== Function ==
=== Differentiation capacity ===
MSCs have a great capacity for self-renewal while maintaining their multipotency. Recent work suggests that β-catenin, via regulation of EZH2, is a central molecule in maintaining the "stemness" of MSCs. The standard test to confirm multipotency is differentiation of the cells into osteoblasts, adipocytes and chondrocytes as well as myocytes.

Doubt remains about whether the MSC-derived neurons are functional. The degree to which the culture will differentiate varies among individuals and how differentiation is induced, e.g., chemical vs. mechanical; and it is not clear whether this variation is due to a different amount of "true" progenitor cells in the culture or variable differentiation capacities of individuals' progenitors. The capacity of cells to proliferate and differentiate is known to decrease with the age of the donor, as well as the time in culture. Likewise, whether this is due to a decrease in the number of MSCs or a change to the existing MSCs is not known.

=== Immunomodulatory effects ===
MSCs have an effect on innate and specific immune cells, and research has shown an ability to suppress tumor growth. MSCs produce many immunomodulatory molecules including prostaglandin E2 (PGE2), nitric oxide, indoleamine 2,3-dioxygenase (IDO), interleukin 6 (IL-6), and other surface markers such as FasL, PD-L1 and PD-L2.

MSCs have an effect on macrophages, neutrophils, NK cells, mast cells and dendritic cells in innate immunity. MSCs are able to migrate to the site of injury, where they polarize through PGE2 macrophages in M2 phenotype which is characterized by an anti-inflammatory effect. Further, PGE2 inhibits the ability of mast cells to degranulate and produce TNF-α. Proliferation and cytotoxic activity of NK cells is inhibited by PGE2 and IDO. MSCs also reduce the expression of NK cell receptors - NKG2D, NKp44 and NKp30. MSCs inhibit respiratory flare and apoptosis of neutrophils by production of cytokines IL-6 and IL-8. Differentiation and expression of dendritic cell surface markers is inhibited by IL-6 and PGE2 of MSCs. The immunosuppressive effects of MSC also depend on IL-10, but it is not certain whether they produce it alone, or only stimulate other cells to produce it.

Bone marrow MSCs are capable to produce IL-7 and IL-15 and have been shown to promote early NK cell differentiation as well as long-term cytotoxic memory CD8 T cell survival. MSC expresses the adhesion molecules VCAM-1 and ICAM-1, which allow T-lymphocytes to adhere to their surface. Then MSC can affect them by molecules which have a short half-life and their effect is in the immediate vicinity of the cell. These include nitric oxide, PGE2, HGF, and activation of receptor PD-1. MSCs reduce T cell proliferation between G0 and G1 cell cycle phases and decrease the expression of IFNγ of Th1 cells while increasing the expression of IL-4 of Th2 cells. MSCs also inhibit the proliferation of B-lymphocytes between G0 and G1 cell cycle phases.

=== Antimicrobial properties ===
MSCs produce several antimicrobial peptides (AMPs), including human cathelicidin LL-37, β-defensins, lipocalin 2 and hepcidin. These peptides, together with the enzyme indoleamine 2,3-dioxygenase (IDO), are responsible for the broad-spectrum antibacterial activity of MSCs.

== Clinical significance ==
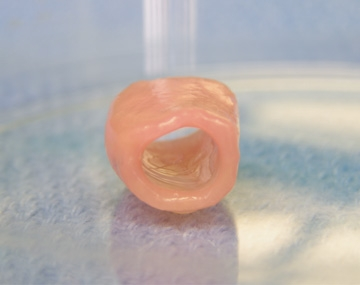
Typical gross appearance of a tubular cartilaginous construct engineered from amniotic mesenchymal stem cells

Mesenchymal stem cells can be activated and mobilized in reaction to injury and infection. As of May 2024, a search for "mesenchymal stem cells" or "mesenchymal stromal cells" at ClinicalTrials.gov returns more than 1,760 studies featuring MSCs for more than 920 conditions.

=== Autoimmune disease ===
Clinical studies investigating the efficacy of mesenchymal stem cells in treating diseases are in clinical development around the world, particularly treating autoimmune diseases, graft versus host disease, Crohn's disease, multiple sclerosis, systemic lupus erythematosus and systemic sclerosis.

=== Other diseases ===
Many of the early clinical successes using intravenous transplantation came in systemic diseases such as graft versus host disease and sepsis. Direct injection or placement of cells into a site in need of repair may be the preferred method of treatment, as vascular delivery suffers from a "pulmonary first pass effect" where intravenous injected cells are sequestered in the lungs.

Further studies into the mechanisms of MSC action may provide avenues for increasing their capacity for tissue repair.

== Research ==
Laboratory research techniques use colony-forming unit-fibroblasts where raw unpurified bone marrow or purified bone marrow mononuclear cells are applied directly into plastic cell culture plates or flasks within two days.

Researchers have successfully isolated and expanded MSCs from marrow samples, demonstrating their ability to differentiate into specific cell lineages under controlled laboratory conditions. Environmental factors like nutrients, spatial organization, and signaling molecules influence MSC behavior and differentiation.

Researchers developed a nanoparticle system to help MSCs support bone regeneration more effectively by delivering a protective gene (Nrf2) and a steroid (dexamethasone).

Other flow cytometry-based methods allow the sorting of bone marrow cells for specific surface markers, such as STRO-1. STRO-1+ cells are generally more homogenous and have higher rates of adherence and higher rates of proliferation, but the exact differences between STRO-1+ cells and MSCs are not clear.

The supplementation of basal media with fetal bovine serum or human platelet lysate is common in MSC culture. Prior to the use of platelet lysates for MSC culture, the pathogen inactivation process may inhibit pathogen transmission. Various chemicals and methods, including low-level laser irradiation, have been used to increase stem cell proliferation.

MSC exosomes are tested as a potential treatment for intravascular coagulation due to their possible anti-inflammatory and anticoagulant properties.

== History ==
Scientists Ernest A. McCulloch and James E. Till first revealed the clonal nature of marrow cells in the 1960s. In 1970, Arnold Caplan identified certain conditions by which mesodermal cells differentiate into cartilage or myogenic (muscle) tissue and bone and named them mesenchymal stem cells.

An ex vivo assay for examining the clonogenic potential of multipotent marrow cells was later reported in the 1970s by Friedenstein and colleagues. In this assay system, stromal cells were referred to as colony-forming unit-fibroblasts (CFU-f).

Subsequent experimentation revealed the plasticity of marrow cells and how their fate is determined by environmental cues. Culturing marrow stromal cells in the presence of osteogenic stimuli such as ascorbic acid, inorganic phosphate and dexamethasone could promote their differentiation into osteoblasts. In contrast, the addition of transforming growth factor-beta (TGF-b) could induce chondrogenic markers.

The first clinical trials of MSCs were completed in 1995 when a group of 15 patients were injected with cultured MSCs to test the safety of the treatment. The first regulatory approvals for MSCs were granted conditional approval in 2012 in Canada and New Zealand for treating Graft vs. Host Disease (GvHD) and, subsequently, in Japan to treat Crohn's Disease-related fistula. MSC therapy was approved by the FDA in the United States of America in 2024 for Graft vs. Host Disease (GvHD).

Since then, more than 1,500 clinical trials have been conducted to treat numerous conditions.

== Controversies ==
The term "mesenchymal stem cells" has been debated for years and remains controversial, despite its widespread adoption in scientific literature. It has been argued that "mesenchymal stem cells" or "MSCs" are not 'mesenchymal in origin' nor are they bonafide 'stem cells.' Most mesenchymal cell or "MSC" preps only contain a minority fraction of true multipotent stem cells, with most cells being stromal in nature, and it has been proposed that the term should be renamed to 'mesenchymal stromal cells'. Caplan proposed rephrasing MSCs to emphasize their role as "medicinal signaling cells." Within the stem cell field, the shorthand "MSC" most commonly refers to "mesenchymal stromal/stem cells" because of the heterogeneous nature of the cellular preparations.

The study of MSCs has been vastly done via a 'translation in reverse' strategy, prioritizing clinical applications before understanding the fundamental physiology and mechanisms that underlie the MSCs ability to differentiate into various tissues and modulate local cell activity. This has led to the marketing and application of unregulated and unsafe mesenchymal stem cell therapies in for-profit clinics, leading to adverse outcomes for unsuspecting patients. However, the overall benefit of mesenchymal stem cell therapies in regulated global clinical trials remains to be determined, and must be evaluated a case by case basis. For example, mesenchymal stem cell therapies have shown success in treating Graft vs. Host Disease (GvHD).

See also

- Bone marrow
- Fibroblast
- Muse cell
- Intramembranous ossification
- Mesenchyme
- Multipotency
- Cord lining
- Bone marrow adipose tissue
- List of human cell types derived from the germ layers
