= Dental notation =

Overview of different dental naming systems

Comparison of alphanumeric notation, Palmer notation, ISO 3950 (FDI) notation, Universal Numbering System, and paleoanthropology notation

Dental professionals, in writing or speech, use several different dental notation systems for associating information with a specific tooth. The three most common systems are the FDI World Dental Federation notation (ISO 3950), the Universal Numbering System, and the Palmer notation. The FDI notation is used worldwide, and the Universal is used widely in the United States. The FDI notation can be easily adapted to computerized charting.

Another system is used by paleoanthropologists.

== History ==
A committee of the American Dental Association (ADA) recommended the use of the Palmer notation method in 1947.

Since Palmer notation method required the use of symbols, its use was difficult on keyboards. As a result, the association officially supported the Universal system in 1968. The World Health Organization and the Fédération Dentaire Internationale officially uses the two-digit numbering system of the FDI system.

However, in 1996, the ADA adopted the ISO System as an alternative to the Universal System.

== FDI World Dental Federation (ISO) notation ==
The FDI World Dental Federation notation ("FDI notation" or "ISO 3950") is widely used by dental professionals internationally to identify and describe a specific tooth.

The FDI notation uses a two-digit numbering system in which the first digit represents a tooth's quadrant and the second digit represents the number of the tooth from the midline of the face. For permanent teeth, the patient's upper right teeth begin with the number "1", the upper left teeth begin with the number "2", the lower left with "3", and the lower right with "4". For primary teeth, the sequence of numbers similarly is 5, 6, 7, and 8 for the teeth in the upper right, upper left, lower left, and lower right respectively. When speaking about a certain tooth such as the permanent maxillary central incisor, the notation is pronounced “one, one”.

Beware of mixing up the teeth in written form such as 11, 12, 13, 14, 15, 16, 17, 18 between the Universal and ISO systems.

For example: retention of a primary molar tooth in the otherwise regular intact lower right jaw, position 5, would be noted as: 41, 42, 43, 44, 85, 46, 47, 48.

                    Permanent dentition
patient's upper right – 1           upper left – 2
    18 17 16 15 14 13 12 11 | 21 22 23 24 25 26 27 28 
 R --------------------------------------------------- L
    48 47 46 45 44 43 42 41 | 31 32 33 34 35 36 37 38 
        lower right – 4             lower left – 3 

                    Primary dentition
        upper right – 5             upper left – 6
             55 54 53 52 51 | 61 62 63 64 65 
          R --------------------------------- L
             85 84 83 82 81 | 71 72 73 74 75 
        lower right – 8             lower left – 7

 I – incisor
 C – canine
 P – premolar
 M – molar

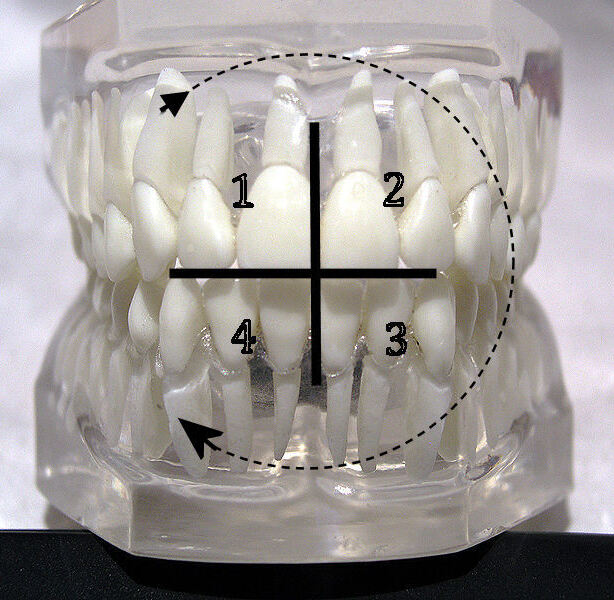
FDI notation: quadrants of the teeth

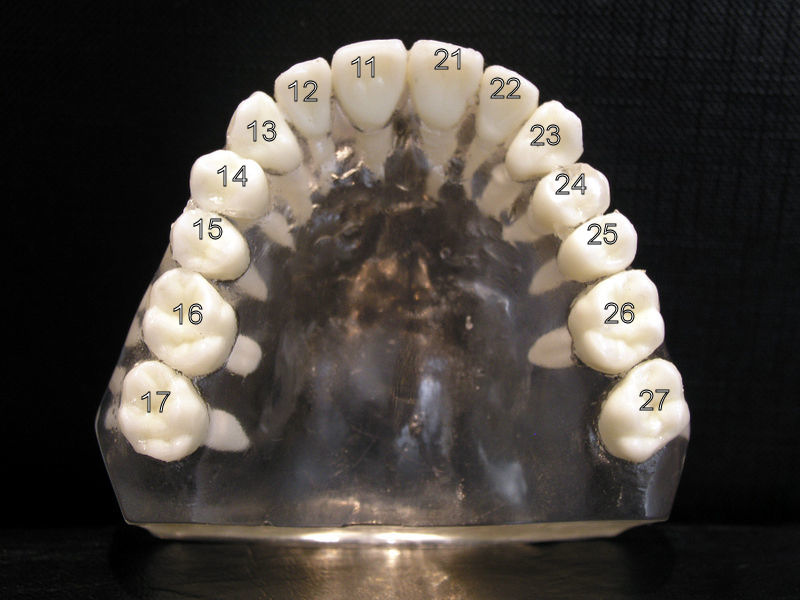
ISO notation upper jaw

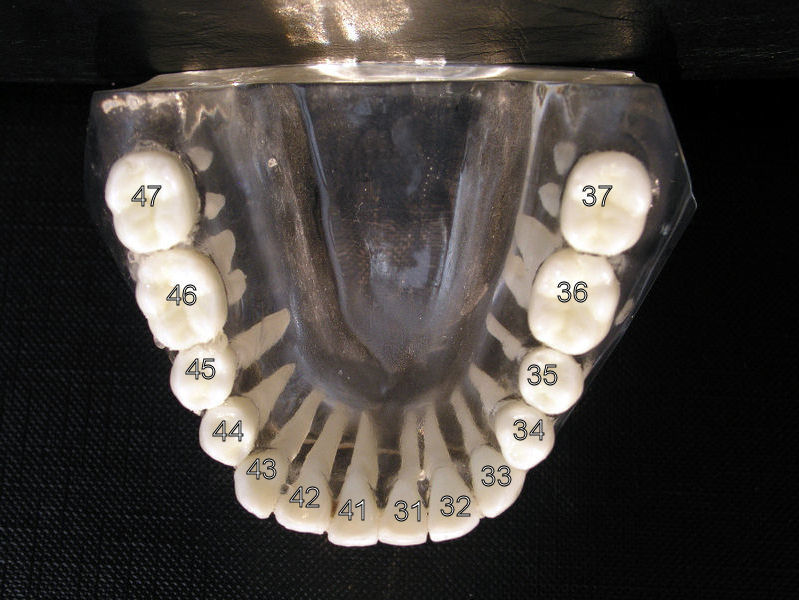
ISO notation lower jaw

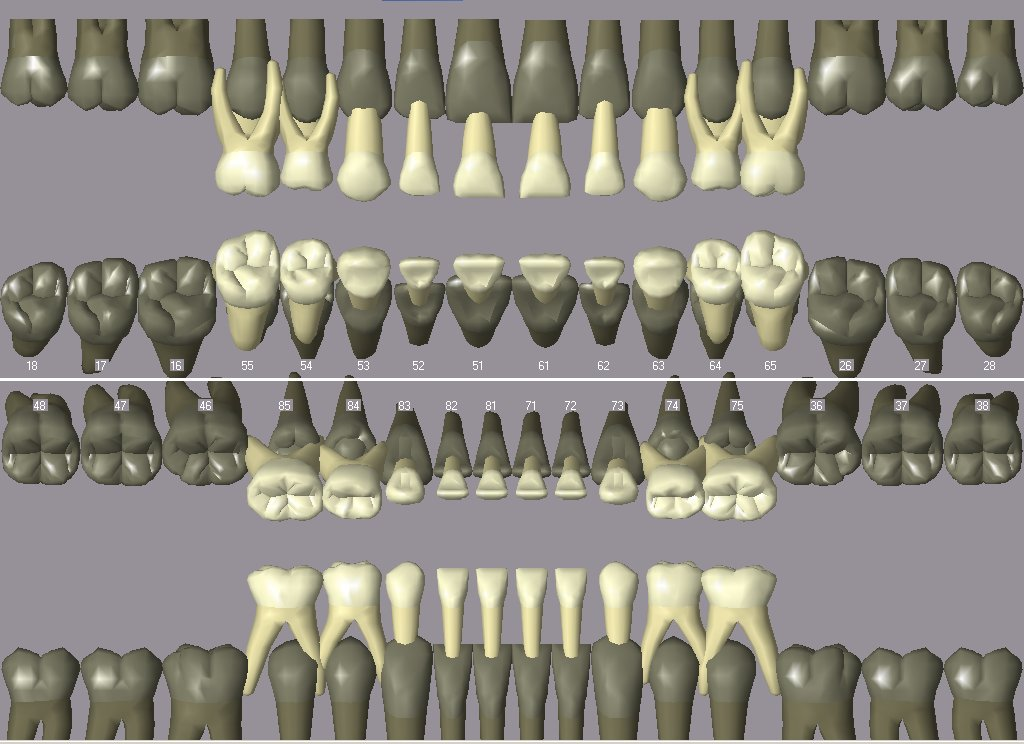
ISO notation primary teeth

== Palmer notation ==
Palmer notation is a system used by dentists to associate information with a specific tooth. It was originally termed the "Zsigmondy system" after the Hungarian dentist Adolf Zsigmondy who developed the idea in 1861, using a Zsigmondy cross to record quadrants of tooth positions.

Permanent teeth (adult) were numbered 1 to 8, and the child primary dentition (also called deciduous, milk or baby teeth) were depicted with a quadrant grid using Roman numerals I, II, III, IV, V to number the teeth from the midline distally. Palmer changed this to A, B, C, D, E.

The Palmer notation consists of a symbol (┘└ ┐┌) designating the quadrant of the tooth and a number indicating the position from the midline. Adult teeth are numbered 1 to 8, with primary teeth indicated by a letter A to E. Hence the left and right maxillary central incisor would have the same number, "1", but the right one would have the symbol, "┘", underneath it, while the left one would have, "└".

Although supposedly superseded by the FDI World Dental Federation notation, it overwhelmingly continues to be the preferred method used by dental students and practitioners in the United Kingdom.

                    Permanent Dentition
        upper right – x┘           upper left – └x
            8 7 6 5 4 3 2 1 | 1 2 3 4 5 6 7 8 
  R --------------------------------------------------- L
            8 7 6 5 4 3 2 1 | 1 2 3 4 5 6 7 8
        lower right – x┐            lower left – ┌x

                     Primary Dentition
        upper right – x┘            upper left – └x
                 E D C B A | A B C D E 
          R --------------------------------- L
                 E D C B A | A B C D E 
        lower right – x┐            lower left – ┌x

I – Incisor
C – Canine
P – premolar
M – molar

== Universal Numbering System ==
Despite its name, the Universal Numbering System is commonly used only in the United States. It is also called the "American system".

The uppercase letters A through T are used for primary teeth and the numbers 1 – 32 are used for permanent teeth. The tooth designated "1" is the maxillary right third molar ("wisdom tooth") and the count continues along the upper teeth to the left side. Then the count begins at the mandibular left third molar, designated number 17, and continues along the bottom teeth to the right side. Each tooth has a unique number or letter, allowing for easier use on keyboards.

Universal Numbering System table
Permanent dentition
upper right								upper left							
1	2	3	4	5	6	7	8	9	10	11	12	13	14	15	16
32	31	30	29	28	27	26	25	24	23	22	21	20	19	18	17
lower right								lower left							
Primary dentition
upper right								upper left							
			A	B	C	D	E	F	G	H	I	J			
			T	S	R	Q	P	O	N	M	L	K			
lower right								lower left							
Alternate system for primary dentition
upper right								upper left							
			1d	2d	3d	4d	5d	6d	7d	8d	9d	10d			
			20d	19d	18d	17d	16d	15d	14d	13d	12d	11d			
lower right								lower left							

== Alphanumeric notation ==
In alphanumeric notation (or "Letters and numbers system"), the four quadrants are designated as:

- UR – upper right
- UL – upper left
- LR – lower right
- LL – lower left

Within each quadrant, the teeth are numbered as in the Palmer notation: 1–8 for permanent and A-E for deciduous, both starting at the midline. For example, the permanent left maxillary first molar is designated UL6.

To prevent uncertainty or ambiguity, teeth may be indicated using more than one notation, particularly when referring for an extraction; this makes it less likely for the incorrect tooth to be needlessly extracted. For instance, a dentist may give an instruction to "extract the 24 (UL4)" for the upper left first premolar tooth.

== Paleoanthropology dental notation ==
Paleoanthropologists use a system suitable to other primates as well. The upper teeth are denoted I^{1}, I^{2}, C^{−}, Pm^{3}, Pm^{4}, M^{1}, M^{2}, and M^{3}. Left or right has to be specified. The lower teeth are I_{1}, I_{2}, C_{−}, Pm_{3}, Pm_{4}, M_{1}, M_{2}, and M_{3}. The reason the premolars are labeled 3 and 4 is that in earlier primates there were two other premolars between them and the canines.
