= Dental arch =

Arrangement and alignment of teeth

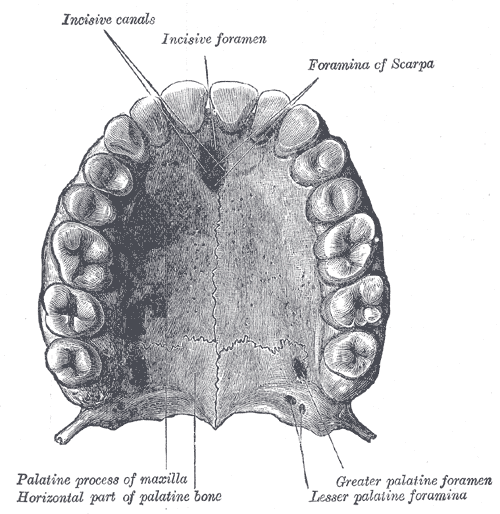
- Permanent teeth of upper dental arch, seen from below.

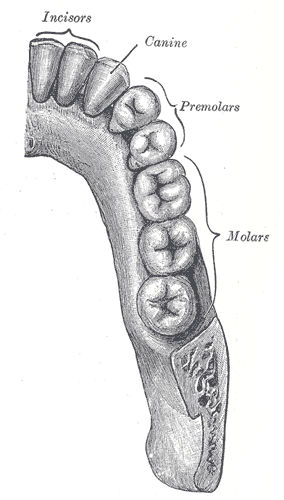
- Permanent teeth of right half of lower dental arch, seen from above.

Details

Identifiers
- Latin: arcus dentalis mandibularis, arcus dentalis maxillaris
- MeSH: D003724

The dental arches are the two arches (crescent arrangements) of teeth, one on each jaw, that together constitute the dentition. In humans and many other species, the superior (maxillary or upper) dental arch is a little larger than the inferior (mandibular or lower) arch, so that in the normal condition the teeth in the maxilla (upper jaw) slightly overlap those of the mandible (lower jaw) both in front and at the sides. The way that the jaws, and thus the dental arches, approach each other when the mouth closes, which is called the occlusion, determines the occlusal relationship of opposing teeth, and it is subject to malocclusion (such as crossbite) if facial or dental development was imperfect.

Because the upper central incisors are wider than the lower ones, the other teeth in the upper arch are arrayed somewhat distally, and the two sets do not quite correspond to each other when the mouth is closed: thus the upper canine tooth rests partly on the lower canine and partly on the lower first premolar, and the cusps of the upper molar teeth lie behind the corresponding cusps of the lower molar teeth.

The two series, however, end at nearly the same point behind; this is mainly because the molars in the upper arch are the smaller.

Since there are a standard number of teeth in humans, the size of the dental arch is of vital importance in determining how the teeth are positioned when they appear. While the arch can expand as a child grows, a small arch will force the teeth to grow close together. This can result in overlapping and improperly positioned teeth. Teeth may tilt at an awkward angle, putting pressure on gums when food is being chewed. This can ultimately lead to compromised gums or infections.

Dentists replace missing, damaged, and severely decayed teeth by fixed or removable prostheses to restore or improve mastication function. There is a fundamental question in any treatment plan, namely, the desirable/mandatory length of an occlusal table.

There have been various references in the literature to the concept of the short dental arch (SDA) as a defined treatment option for the partially dentate patient. While many dentists may accept that restoring the complete dental arch is not always necessary, there still is the need to provide the patient with an affordable and functional treatment, a need satisfied by the short dental arch.

A hemiarch (hemi- + arch) is the right or left half of an arch. It corresponds to 1 of the 4 quadrants.

== See also ==
- Full arch restoration
