= FDI World Dental Federation notation =

World's most commonly used dental notation

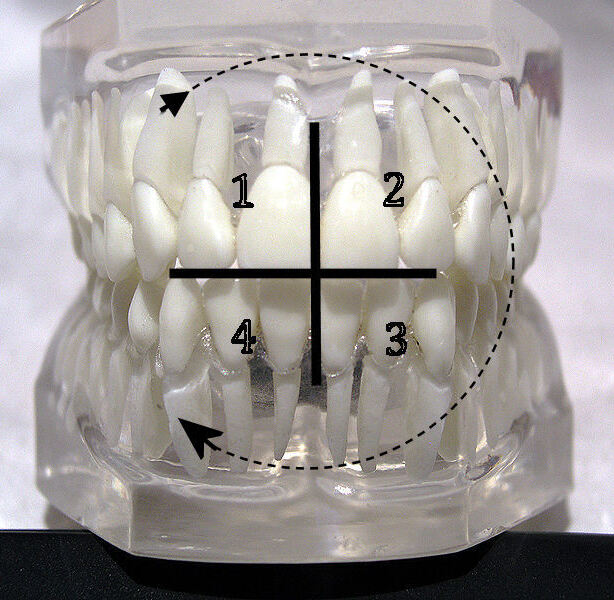
FDI Notation, teeth's quadrants

FDI World Dental Federation notation (also called FDI notation or ISO 3950 notation) is the world's most commonly used dental notation (tooth numbering system). It is designated by the International Organization for Standardization as standard ISO 3950 "Dentistry — Designation system for teeth and areas of the oral cavity".

The system is developed by the FDI World Dental Federation. It is also used by the World Health Organization, and is used in most countries of the world except the United States (which uses the UNS).

The system uses two numbers to define each tooth. One to specify the quadrant, and one to specify the tooth within that quadrant.

Orientation of the chart is traditionally "dentist's view", i.e. patient's right corresponds to notation chart left. The designations "left" and "right" on the chart below correspond to the patient's left and right.

== Table of codes ==
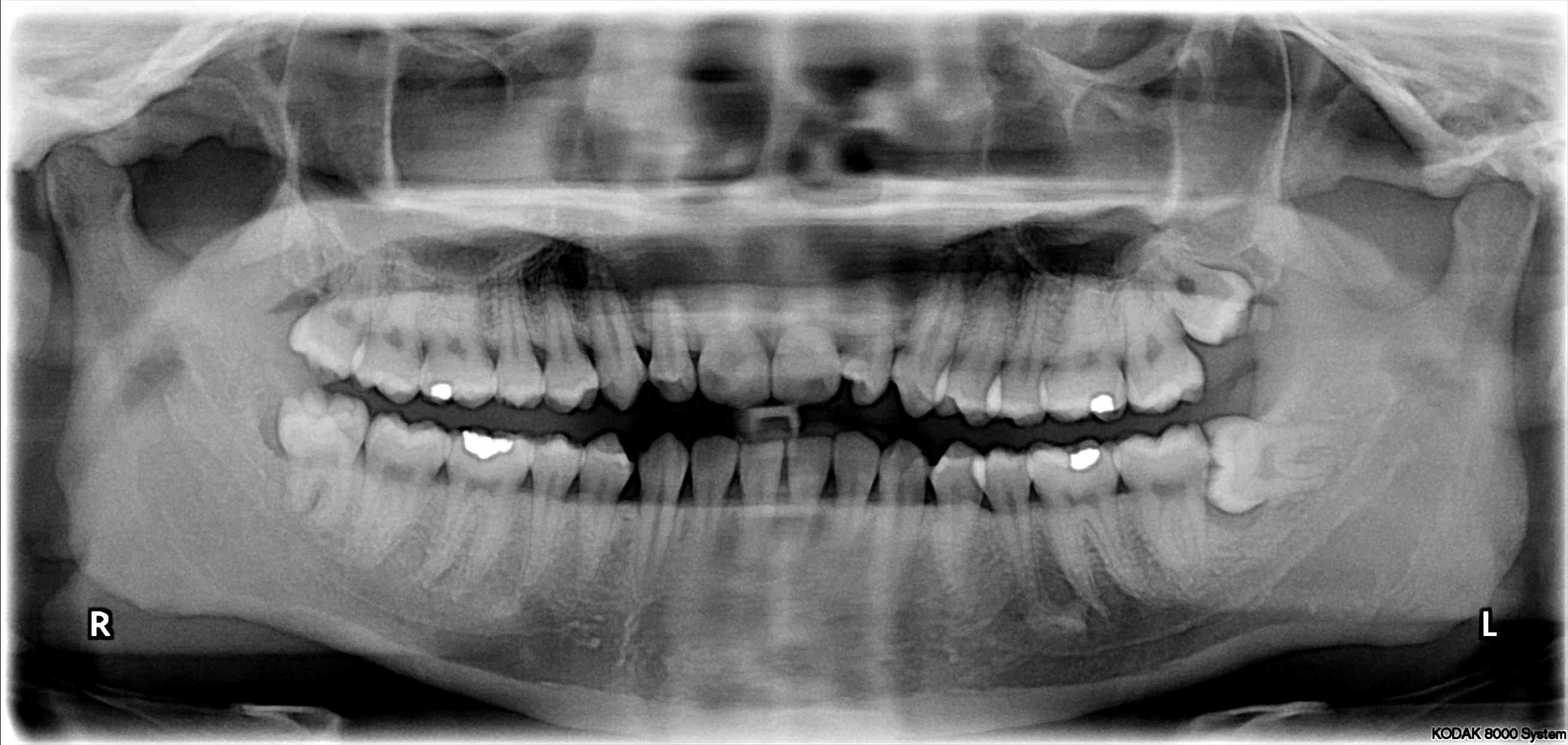
X-ray of the teeth and jaw showing the normal permanent teeth. The last two teeth on the patient's left (the dentist's right), 28 and 38 - the maxillary and mandibular third molars (popularly the upper and lower wisdom teeth) are severely impacted.

FDI two-digit notation
Permanent teeth
patient's upper right								patient's upper left							
18	17	16	15	14	13	12	11	21	22	23	24	25	26	27	28
patient's lower right								patient's lower left							
48	47	46	45	44	43	42	41	31	32	33	34	35	36	37	38
Deciduous teeth (baby teeth)
upper right								upper left							
			55	54	53	52	51	61	62	63	64	65			
lower right								lower left							
			85	84	83	82	81	71	72	73	74	75			

Comparison of alphanumeric notation, Palmer notation, ISO 3950 (FDI) notation, Universal Numbering System, and paleoanthropology notation

Codes, names, and usual number of roots: (see chart of teeth at Universal Numbering System)

- 11 21 51 61 maxillary central incisor 1
- 41 31 81 71 mandibular central incisor 1
- 12 22 52 62 maxillary lateral incisor 1
- 42 32 82 72 mandibular lateral incisor 1
- 13 23 53 63 maxillary canine 1
- 43 33 83 73 mandibular canine 1
- 14 24 maxillary first premolar 2
- 44 34 mandibular first premolar 1
- 15 25 maxillary second premolar 1
- 45 35 mandibular second premolar 1
- 16 26 54 64 maxillary first molar 3
- 46 36 84 74 mandibular first molar 2
- 17 27 55 65 maxillary second molar 3
- 47 37 85 75 mandibular second molar 2
- 18 28 maxillary third molar 3
- 48 38 mandibular third molar 2
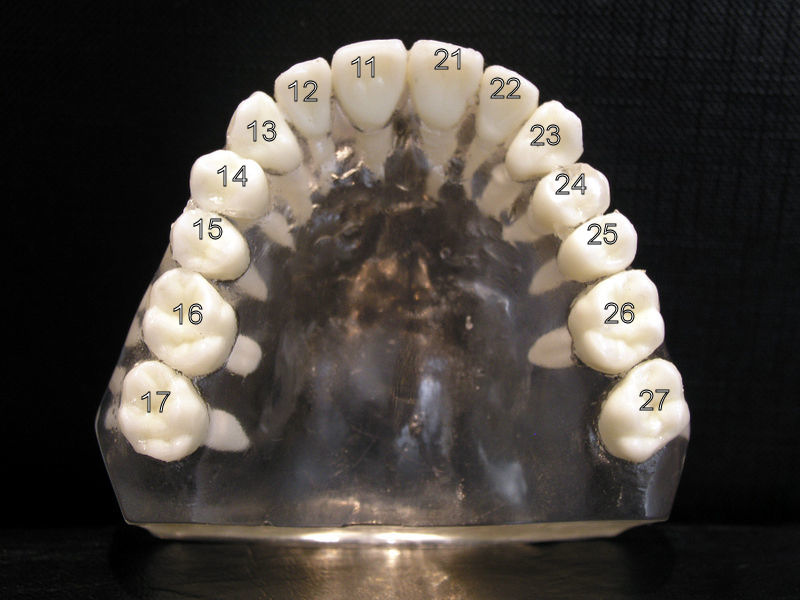
ISO notation upper jaw (wisdom teeth removed)

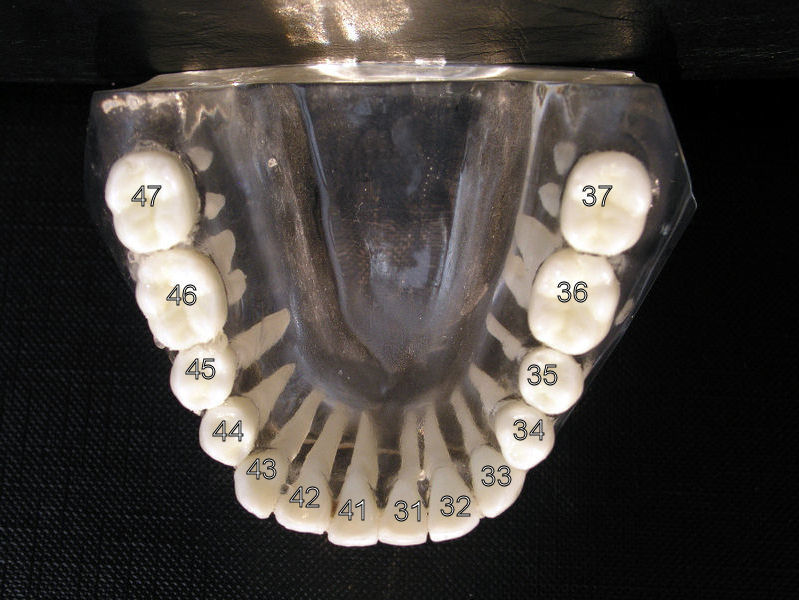
ISO notation lower jaw (wisdom teeth removed)

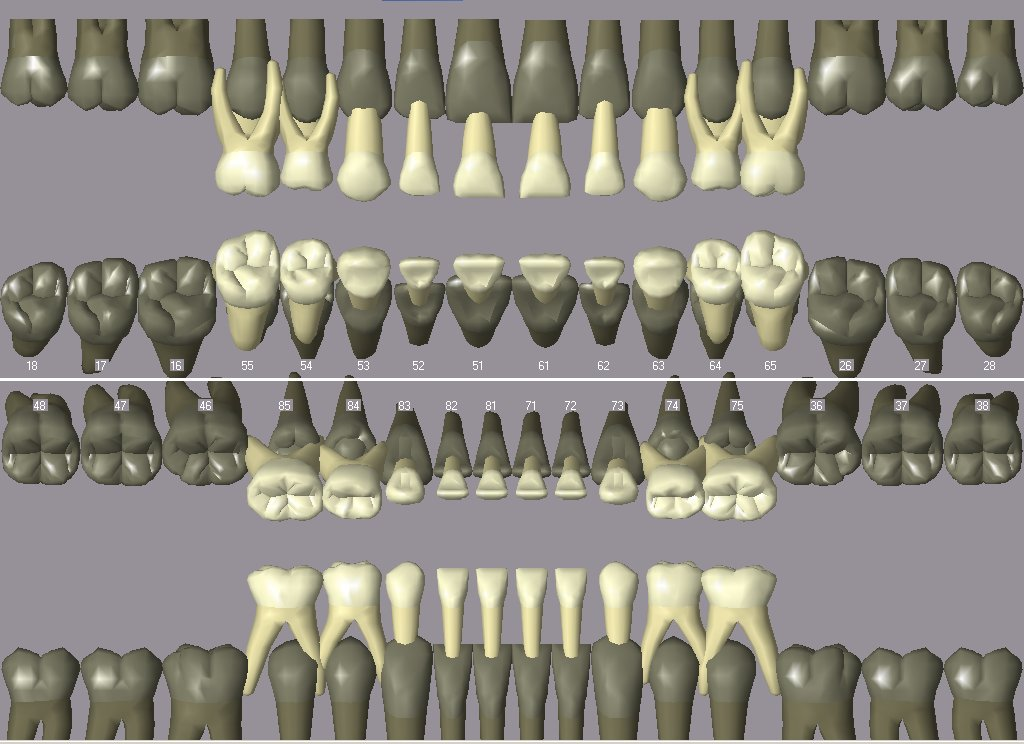
ISO notation primary teeth

== How the codes are constructed ==
The syntax is the quadrant code followed by the tooth code. Sometimes a dot is inserted between the quadrant code and tooth code in order to avoid ambiguity with other numbering systems, especially the UNS.

Quadrant codes
1	upper right permanent teeth
2	upper left permanent teeth
3	lower left permanent teeth
4	lower right permanent teeth
5	upper right deciduous teeth
6	upper left deciduous teeth
7	lower left deciduous teeth
8	lower right deciduous teeth
This is set by going clockwise from the dentist's view.

Tooth codes
1	central incisors
2	lateral incisors
3	canines / cuspids
4	1st premolars / bicuspids (permanent teeth) / 1st molar (deciduous teeth)
5	2nd premolars / bicuspids (permanent teeth) / 2nd molar (deciduous teeth)
6	1st molars (permanent teeth)
7	2nd molars (permanent teeth)
8	3rd molars / wisdom teeth (permanent teeth)
This is defined by counting from the center outward.

Examples:

- "13" = permanent upper right, 3rd tooth (canine / cuspid)
- "32" = permanent lower left, 2nd tooth (lateral incisor)

== See also ==
- Dental notation
- Universal numbering system
- Palmer notation
