= Mandibular premolar =

Mandibular premolar may refer to:

- Mandibular first premolar
- Mandibular second premolar
