= Maxillary lateral incisor =

Tooth (one of a pair) in upper jaw adjacent to the maxillary central incisor

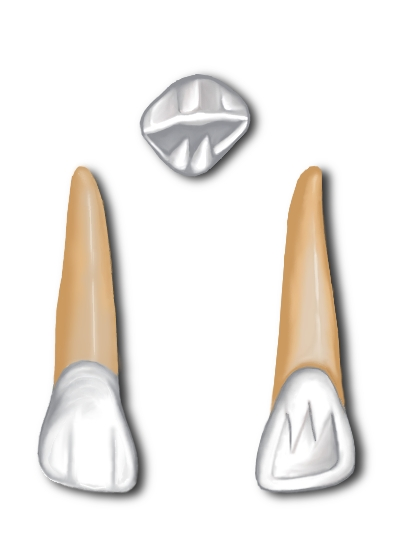
- Maxillary lateral incisor

Identifiers
- FMA: 290194

The maxillary lateral incisors are a pair of upper (maxillary) teeth that are located laterally (away from the midline of the face) from both maxillary central incisors of the mouth and medially (toward the midline of the face) from both maxillary canines. As with all incisors, their function is for shearing or cutting food during mastication, commonly known as chewing. There are generally no cusps on the teeth, but the rare condition known as talon cusps are most prevalent on the maxillary lateral incisors. The surface area of the tooth used in eating is called an incisal ridge or incisal edge. Though relatively the same, there are some minor differences between the deciduous (baby) maxillary lateral incisor and that of the permanent maxillary lateral incisor. The maxillary lateral incisors occlude in opposition to the mandibular lateral incisors.

== Notation ==
In the universal system of notation, the deciduous maxillary lateral incisors are designated by a letter written in uppercase. The right deciduous maxillary lateral incisor is known as "D", and the left one is known as "G". The international notation has a different system of notation. Thus, the right deciduous maxillary lateral incisor known as "52", and the left one is known as "62".

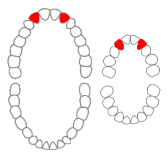
Maxillary lateral incisors of permanent and primary teeth are marked in red.

In the universal system of notation, the permanent maxillary lateral incisors are designated by a number. The right permanent maxillary lateral incisor is known as "7", and the left one is known as "10". In the Palmer notation, a number is used in conjunction with a symbol designating in which quadrant the tooth is found. For this tooth, the left and right lateral incisors would have the same number, "2", but the right one would have the symbol, "┘", underneath it, while the left one would have, "└". The FDI notation has a different numbering system than the previous two, and the right permanent maxillary lateral incisor is known as "12", and the left one is known as "22".

== Development ==
The primary tooth will begin to show signs of development between 14 2/3 weeks and 16 1/2 weeks in utero, at an average of 16 weeks.

The permanent tooth typically will erupt between when the child is 8 or 9 years old, while the root will continue to mineralize until around 11 years old. The tooth's crown will conclude its development around the age of 4 or 5. The upper lateral incisor is made of 4 lobes of calcification (3 labial will give rise to mamelons and 1 lingual give rise to cingulum). When the middle labial lobe is missing the mesial and distal labial lobes will bend on each other creating what is called "peg shaped laterals". Treatment usually include buildup by composite or a fixed crown restoration. The upper laterals are the 2nd most varied teeth, after the 3rd molars. They can be peg shaped, twisted crown and roots, and sometimes missing.

== Deciduous dentition ==
There are two maxillary lateral incisors in the deciduous dentition. The teeth have a more curved distoincisal angle than the primary maxillary central incisor. The tooth is longer cervicoincisally than it is mesiodistally. The average length of the primary lateral incisor is 15.8 mm, with the average crown length being 5.6 mm and the root length average being 11.4 mm.

All primary teeth have several characteristics that are different when compared to the permanent dentition. The primary lateral incisor crown is wider mesiodistally than the permanent tooth and the roots of the primary lateral incisors are longer than the permanent tooth. The cervical ridges in all of anterior teeth are more prominent than in the

== Permanent dentition ==
There are two maxillary lateral incisors in the permanent dentition, which begin to show signs of development at 10 to 12 months after birth. The maxillary lateral incisor resembles the maxillary central incisor, but is smaller in every dimension aside from root length. The root of the lateral incisor is around 1.5 times the length of the crown. The tooth has the most variability in crown shape in the mouth except the maxillary third molar. The two lateral incisors can also be congenitally missing. The teeth are less pigmented and are whiter in appearance than the permanent teeth.

=== Labial aspect ===
Compared to the maxillary central incisor, the maxillary lateral incisor has more rounded mesial and distal incisal angles. The distal outline is always more rounded. The root is often tapered distally, often with a sharp curve distally and to an apex; however, the curve can be absent. The mesial and distal contacts are more cervical than the central incisor. The surface is smooth. The labial view of the lateral incisor fits into the geometric shape of a trapezoid.

=== Lingual aspect ===
The distal and mesial marginal ridges are evident and the cingulum is prominent. The lingual fossa is more concave than the central incisor. The cingulum will often have a deep developmental groove on the distal side that can continue well into the root. The lingual view of the lateral incisor fits into the geometric shape of a trapezoid.

=== Mesial aspect ===
The curvature of the cementoenamel junction (CEJ) or the cervical line sharply inclines towards the incisal ridge. The mesial view of the lateral incisor fits into the geometric shape of a triangle.

=== Distal aspect ===
Compared to the tooth's mesial view of the cervical line, the distal cervical line is slightly more cervical by close to a millimeter. There may be a developmental groove present for all or most of the length. The distal view of the lateral incisor fits into the geometric shape of a triangle.
