= American System =

American System may refer to:

- American System (economic plan), an 1800s economic program of Henry Clay and the Whig Party based on the "American School" ideas of Alexander Hamilton
- American system, an informal name for the Universal Numbering System dental notation introduced in the US in the 1800s
- American system of manufacturing, a set of manufacturing methods that evolved in the 19th century in the US
- American system passenger coach or "open coach", a style of railway passenger coach first introduced in the 1800s in the US
- United States customary units, a system of measurement used in the US
