= Zuckerkandl's tubercle =

Zuckerkandl's tubercle may refer to:

- Zuckerkandl's tubercle (thyroid gland)
- Zuckerkandl's tubercle (teeth)
