= Zuckerkandl's tubercle (teeth) =

Morphological feature of molar teeth

The Zuckerkandl's tubercle is a small cervical tubercle at the mesiobuccal crown margin of maxillary and mandibular deciduous first molars over the mesial root. It is one of the key identifying features of the teeth. The tubercle is always present, regardless of age or ethnicity

== See also ==
- Cusp of Carabelli
