= Maxillary central incisor =

Tooth

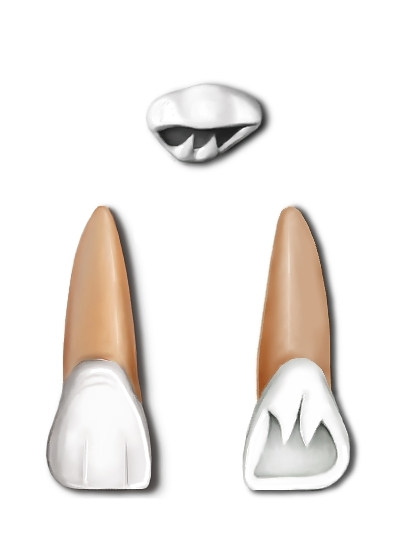
- Maxillary central incisor

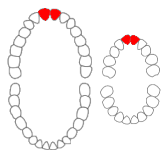
- Maxillary central incisors of permanent and primary teeth marked in red.

Identifiers
- FMA: 290180

The maxillary central incisor is a human tooth in the front upper jaw, or maxilla, and is usually the most visible of all teeth in the mouth. It is located mesial (closer to the midline of the face) to the maxillary lateral incisor. As with all incisors, their function is for shearing or cutting food during mastication (chewing). There is typically a single cusp on each tooth, called an incisal ridge or incisal edge. Formation of these teeth begins at 14 weeks in utero for the deciduous (baby) set and 3–4 months of age for the permanent set.

There are some minor differences between the deciduous maxillary central incisor and that of the permanent maxillary central incisor. The deciduous tooth appears in the mouth at 8–12 months of age and shed at 6–7 years, and is replaced by the permanent tooth around 7–8 years of age. The permanent tooth is larger and is longer than it is wide. The maxillary central incisors contact each other at the midline of the face. The mandibular central incisors are the only other type of teeth to do so. The position of these teeth may determine the existence of an open bite or diastema. As with all teeth, variations of size, shape, and color exist among people. Systemic disease, such as syphilis, may affect the appearance of teeth.

== Notation ==
Dentistry has several systems of notation to identify teeth. In the universal system of notation, the deciduous maxillary central incisors are designated by a letter written in uppercase. The right deciduous maxillary central incisor is known as "E", and the left one is known as "F". The permanent maxillary central incisors are designated by a number. The right permanent maxillary central incisor is known as "8", and the left one is known as "9".

In the Palmer notation, a letter is used in conjunction with a symbol designating in which quadrant the tooth is found. For the deciduous teeth, the left and right central incisor would have the same letter, "A", but the right one would have the symbol, "┘", underneath it, while the left one would have, "└". For the permanent teeth, the left and right central incisor would have the same number, "1", but the right one would have the symbol, "┘", underneath it, while the left one would have, "└".

The FDI World Dental Federation notation has a different system of numbering system from the previous two. Thus, the right deciduous maxillary central incisor is known as "51", and the left one is known as "61". For the permanent maxillary central incisor, the right one is known as "11", and the left one is known as "21".

== Development ==
The aggregate of cells which eventually form a tooth are derived from the ectoderm of the first branchial arch and the ectomesenchyme of the neural crest. As in all cases of tooth development, the first hard tissue to begin forming is dentin, with enamel appearing immediately afterwards.

The deciduous maxillary central incisor begins to undergo mineralization 14 weeks in utero, and at birth 5/6ths of the enamel is formed. The crown of the tooth is completed 1.5 months after birth and erupts into the mouth at around 10 months of age, making these teeth usually the second type of teeth to appear. The root completes its formation when the child is 1.5 years old.

The permanent maxillary central incisor begins to undergo mineralization when a child is 3–4 months of age. The crown of the tooth is completed at around 4–5 years of age and erupts into the mouth at 7–8 years of age. The root completes its formation when the child is 10 years old.

== Deciduous dentition ==
The overall length of the deciduous maxillary central incisor is 16 mm on average, with the crown being 6 mm and the root being 10 mm. In comparison to the permanent maxillary central incisor, the ratio of the root length to the crown length is greater in the deciduous tooth. The diameter of the crown mesiodistally is greater than the length cervicoincisally, which makes the tooth appear wider rather than taller from a labial viewpoint.

The marginal ridges and the cingulum of the tooth are well-developed. The cingulum reaches incisally a great length and is large enough to create small fossa on either side of it. Depicted by the cementoenamel junction, the cervical line is the border between the root and crown of a tooth. On the mesial and distal surfaces, the cervical line curves incisally, which is also seen in the permanent maxillary central incisor.

The root of this tooth is cone-shaped with a rounded apex. Most of the surfaces are smooth, but the mesial surface of the root may have a developmental groove or a concavity.

== Permanent dentition ==
The permanent maxillary central incisor is the widest tooth mesiodistally in comparison to any other anterior tooth. It is larger than the neighboring lateral incisor and is usually not as convex on its labial surface. As a result, the central incisor appears to be more rectangular or square in shape. The mesial incisal angle is sharper than the distal incisal angle. When this tooth is newly erupted into the mouth, the incisal edges have three rounded features called mammelons. Mammelons disappear with time as the enamel wears away by friction.

Generally, there are gender differences in the appearance of this tooth. In males, the size of the maxillary central incisor is larger usually than in females. Gender differences in enamel thickness and dentin width are low. Age differences in the gingival-incisal length of maxillary central incisors are seen and are attributed to normal attrition occurring throughout life. Thus, younger individuals have a greater gingival incisal length of the teeth than older individuals.

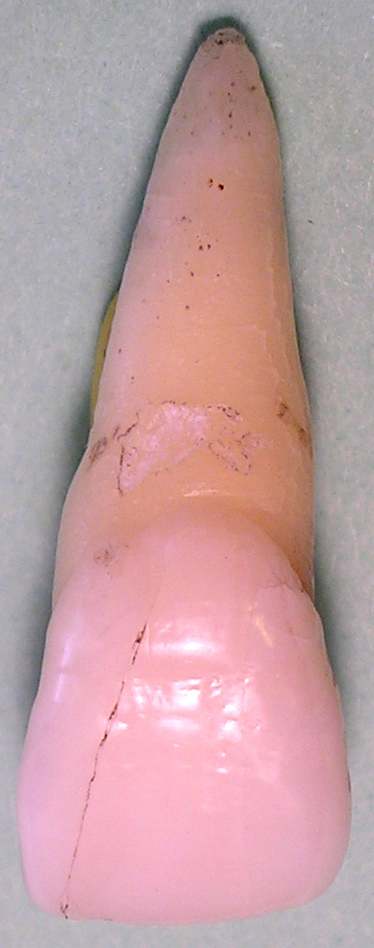
Labial view

=== Labial view ===
The labial view of this tooth considers the portion of the tooth visible from the side where the lips would be. The mesial outline of the tooth is straight or slightly convex, whereas the distal outline is much more convex. Consequently, the height of curvature (the point furthest away from the central axis of the tooth) is closer to the mesioincisal angle on the mesial side while more apical on the distal side. The distal outline of the crown is more convex than the mesial outline, and the distoincisal angle is not as sharp as the mesoincisal angle. After the mammelons are worn away, the incisal edge of the maxillary central incisor is straight mesiodistally. The center of the incisal edge curves slightly downward in the center of the tooth. The cervical line, which is seen as the border between the crown and the root of the tooth, is closer to the apex of the root in the center of the tooth. This makes the cervical line appear as a semicircle in shape.

From this view, the root is blunt and cone-shaped. Although there is a large amount of variation between people, the length of the root is usually 2–3 mm longer than the length of the crown. Large curvatures of the root are usually not seen in this tooth.

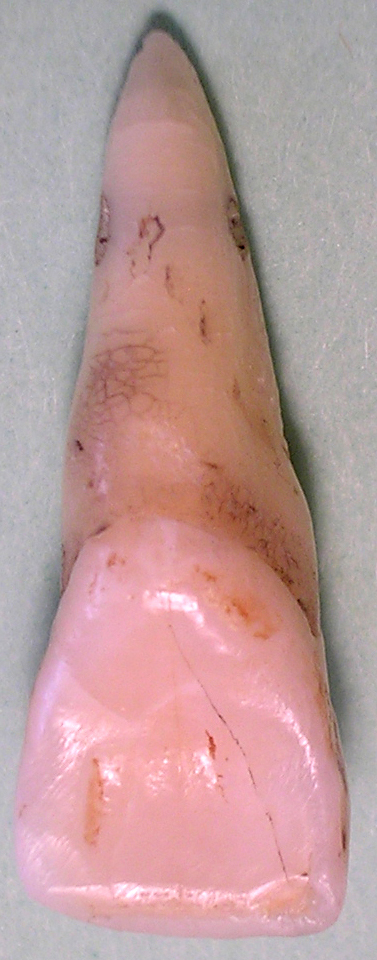
Lingual view

=== Palatal view ===
The palatal view of this tooth considers the portion of the tooth visible from the side where the tongue would be. The palatal side of the maxillary central incisor has a small convexity, called a cingulum near the cervical line and has a large concavity, called the lingual fossa. Along the mesial and distal sides are slightly raised portions called marginal ridges. The lingual incisal edge is also raised slightly to the level of the marginal ridges. The lingual fossa is bordered incisally by the lingual incisal edge, mesially by the mesial marginal ridge, distally by the distal marginal ridge, and cervically by the cingulum. Developmental grooves are found on the cingulum and lying into the lingual fossa.

This side of the tooth tapers in size from the labial side of the tooth. As a result, the mesial and distal sides of the tooth are further away on the labial side than on the lingual side. Furthermore, a cross-section of the tooth at the cervical line would show a general triangle appearance. One of the triangle's sides would be the facial surface, and the other two sides would be the mesial side and the slightly shorter distal side.

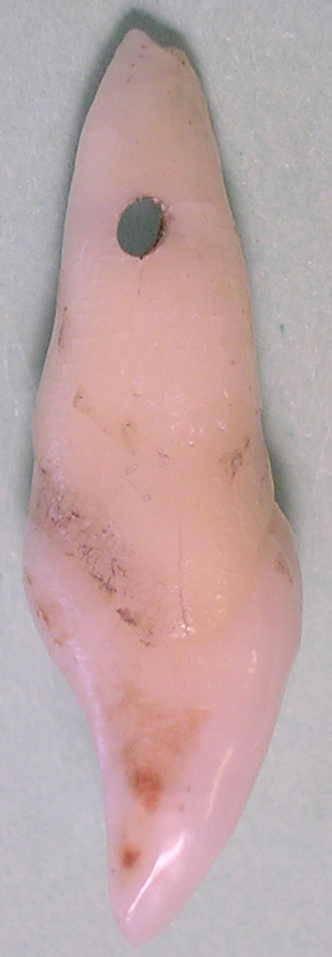
Mesial view

=== Mesial view ===
The mesial view of this tooth considers the portion of the tooth visible from the side closest to where the middle line of the face would be.the mesial axis should be parallel to the midline. The mesial side of the maxillary central incisor shows the crown of the tooth as a triangle with the point at the incisal edge and the base at the cervix. The root appears cone shaped with a blunt apex. Unlike most other teeth, a line drawn through the center of the incisal edge will also cross through the center of the root apex. This also occurs in maxillary lateral incisors.

The crest of curvature for the palatal and labial surfaces is located directly incisally to the cervical line. The labial surface of the crown is convex from the crest of curvature to the incisal edge. The lingual surface of the crown is convex near the cingulum and near the incisal edge, but for the most part is concave along the surface between those two areas.

More than any other tooth in the mouth, the cervical line from this view curves tremendously toward the incisal. In an average crown length of 10.5 to 11 mm, the curvature of the cervical line in a maxillary central incisor is 3 to 4 mm.

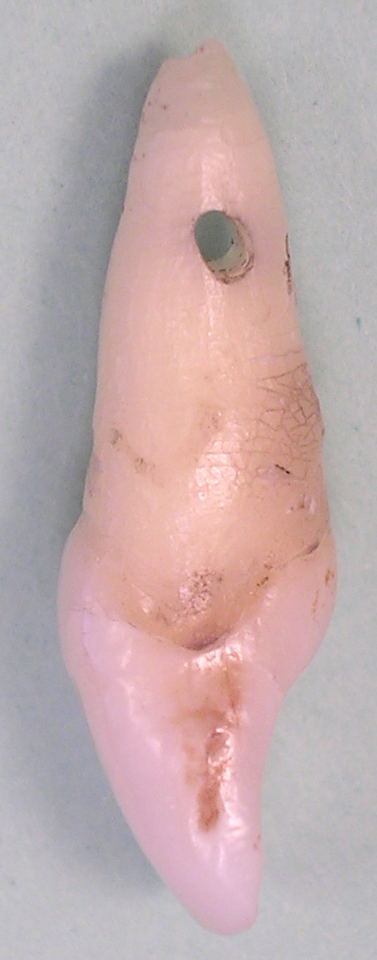
Distal view

=== Distal view ===
The distal view of this tooth considers the portion of the tooth visible from the side furthest from where the middle line of the face would be. This side of the tooth is very similar to the mesial side. A greater portion of the tooth surface facing the lips is visible from this view compared to the mesial view because the labial surface tilts distally and lingually. Also, the cervical line curves less in comparison to the mesial view.

=== Incisal view ===
The incisal view of this tooth considers the portion of the tooth visible from the side where the incisal edge is located. From this angle, only the crown of the tooth is visible, and overall the tooth looks bilateral. The labial surface appears broad and flat. The lingual surface tapers toward the cingulum. The distance between the mesioincisal angle to the cingulum is slightly longer than the distance between the distoincisal angle to the cingulum.

=== Pulp anatomy ===
The pulp is the location of the nerve and blood supply of a tooth. In the deciduous maxillary central incisor, endodontic treatment is less frequent. In the permanent maxillary central incisor, root canal treatment can be effective. There frequently are three pulp horns in this tooth. In nearly all maxillary central incisors, there is one canal with one apex. During root canal therapy, access into the pulp is frequently located centrally on the lingual surface between the incisal edge and the cingulum. At the level of the cervical line, the shape of the canal is triangular but becomes circular at the middle level of the root. Although the root is generally straight, the most common points of curvature is near the apex, and their direction is more common toward the distal and lingual.

== Surrounding teeth ==
=== Interproximal contacts ===
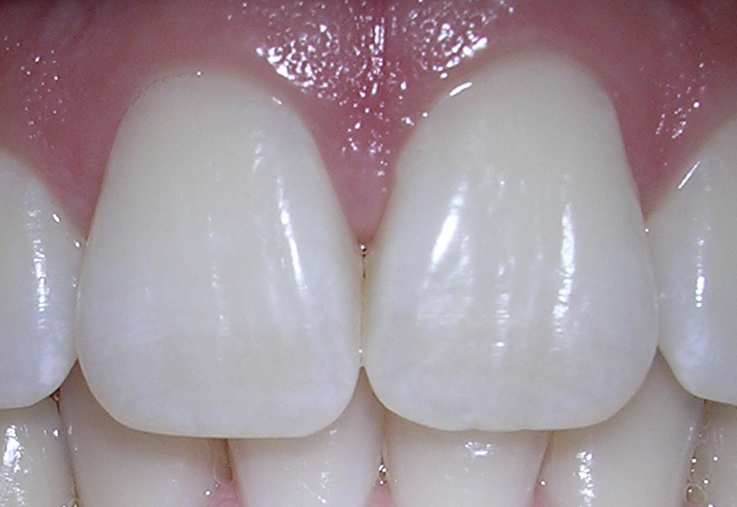
Close up front view

Contact with adjacent teeth in the same arch is referred to as interproximal contacts. The maxillary central incisors are one of only two types of teeth which has an interproximal contact with itself. The other type of teeth is the mandibular central incisors. In usually preferred and healthy states, the central incisors touch in the incisal third of the teeth. On the other hand, the contact between the central incisor and the lateral incisor is nearer the gingiva at the location between the incisal and middle thirds of the tooth's crown.

=== Occlusion ===
As with all max anterior teeth, the central incisors are usually located facially to the mandibular teeth when the mouth is closed. In instances when the maxillary anterior teeth are lingual to the mandibular teeth, the condition is referred to as an anterior crossbite. In some cases, this arrangement of teeth may indicate a displacement of the mandible relative to the maxilla and is called Class III or Pseudo-Class III malocclusion. Normal occlusion is Class I occlusion.

When the teeth are biting down, the maxillary central incisors occlude with the mandibular central and lateral incisors. The contact point of the mandibular teeth is in the lingual fossa of the maxillary central incisor about 4 mm gingivally from the incisal edge. In this position, the maxillary incisors cover nearly half of the mandibular incisors' crowns. When the maxillary and mandibular incisors do not contact even when the mouth is fully closed, an anterior open bite occurs. This misalignment of teeth may result from some habits, such as thumb-sucking. On the other hand, when the contact of the mandibular incisors to the maxillary incisors is near or completely on the gingiva, a deep bite occurs.

== Variation ==
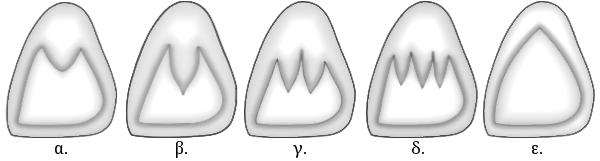
The five different lingual views of maxillary central incisor

Sinodonty, a genetic variation occurring in Native Americans and some East Asian populations, is possibly a trait retained from an indigenous East Asian archaic human ancestor Homo Erectus Pekinensis. Among its features are shovel-shaped incisors that derive their name from the deeper-than-normal lingual fossa and prominent marginal ridges of the teeth. When seen from lingual view, the tooth is said to resemble a shovel and are rotated slightly inward. It is also common to see signs of attrition, which is wear over time from other tooth contact. The lingual of maxillary incisors and the facial of mandibular incisors are the most common places for attrition to occur.

When space exists between the contacts of the maxillary central incisors, the condition is referred to as a diastema or "gap tooth." One frequent cause of the space is the presence of a large labial frenum from the upper lip extending near the teeth. Treatment depends upon the cause and extent of the gap. Periodontal surgery may be required to reduce the frenum. A small space may be corrected with a filling, veneer, or crown. Larger spaces may require orthodontics.

The maxillary incisors, both the central and lateral, are the most likely teeth to have a talon cusp, which is an extra cusp on the lingual surface. Talon cusps range from less than 1% to 6% of the population, and 33% of cases occur on the permanent maxillary central incisor. Deciduous teeth are unlikely to have talon cusps. Also, the permanent maxillary incisors are the most likely teeth to have a dilaceration, which is a sharp curve on a tooth.

All incisors have the potential to be affected by a case of congenital syphilis, which can cause a notch to form on the incisal edges of these teeth. These teeth, sometimes described as screwdriver-shaped, are called "Hutchinson's incisors." They serve as part of Hutchinson's triad, which also includes interstitial keratitis and eighth nerve deafness.

== Sources ==
- Ash, Major M.; Nelson, Stanley J. (2003). Wheeler's Dental Anatomy, Physiology, and Occlusion (8th ed.). W.B. Saunders. ISBN 0-7216-9382-2.
- Nanci, Antonio (2013). Ten Cate's oral histology (8th ed.). Elsevier. ISBN 9780323096300.
- Neville, Brad W. (2002). Oral & Maxillofacial Pathology (2nd ed.). W.B. Saunders. ISBN 0-7216-9003-3.
- Okeson, Jeffrey P. (2003). Management of Temporomandibular Disorders and Occlusion (5th ed.). Mosby. ISBN 0-323-01477-1.
- Scheid, Rickne C. (2012). Woelfel's dental anatomy (8th ed.). Philadelphia: Wolters Kluwer Health/Lippincott Williams & Wilkins. ISBN 978-1608317462.
