= International notation =

International notation may mean:

- FDI World Dental Federation notation
- Hermann–Mauguin notation
- Decimal_mark#Influence_of_calculators_and_computers - the use of the decimal point as the decimal mark
