= Maxillary second premolar =

Upper teeth on the sides of the mouth

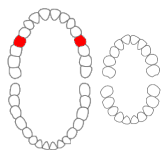
- Maxillary second premolars of permanent teeth marked in red. There are no premolars in primary teeth.

Identifiers
- FMA: 55802

The maxillary second premolar is one of two teeth located in the upper maxilar, laterally (away from the midline of the face) from both the maxillary first premolars of the mouth but mesial (toward the midline of the face) from both maxillary first molars. The function of this premolar is similar to that of first molars in regard to grinding being the principal action during mastication, commonly known as chewing. There are two cusps on maxillary second premolars, but both of them are less sharp than those of the maxillary first premolars. There are no deciduous (baby) maxillary premolars. Instead, the teeth that precede the permanent maxillary premolars are the deciduous maxillary molars.

In the universal system of notation, the permanent maxillary premolars are designated by a number. The right permanent maxillary second premolar is known as "4", and the left one is known as "13". In the Palmer notation, a number is used in conjunction with a symbol designating in which quadrant the tooth is found. For this tooth, the left and right second premolars would have the same number, "5", but the right one would have the symbol, "┘", underneath it, while the left one would have, "└". The international notation has a different numbering system than the previous two, and the right permanent maxillary second premolar is known as "15", and the left one is known as "25".
