= Canine tooth =

Long, pointed tooth in mammals

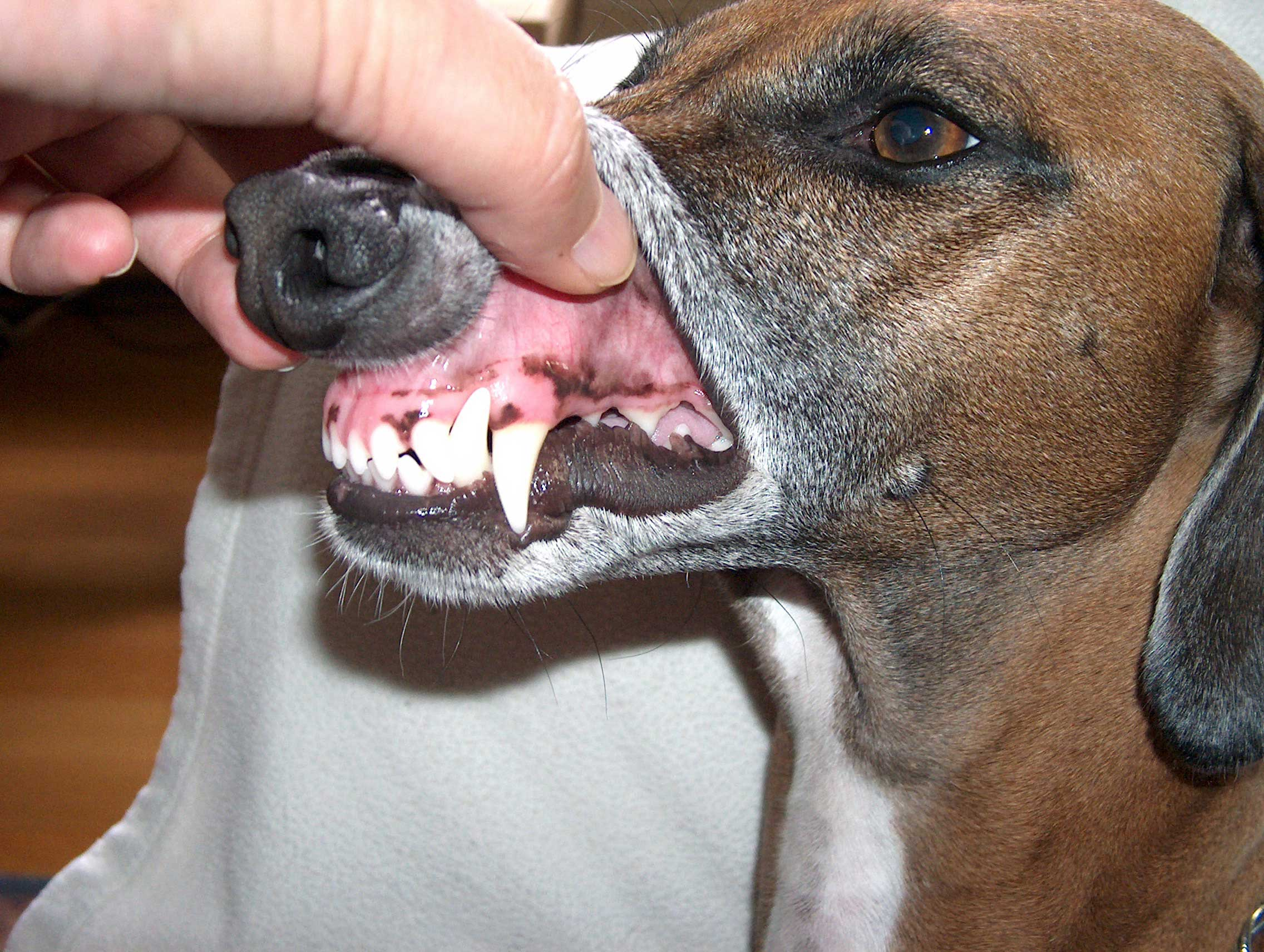
- This dog's longer pointed cuspids or "fangs" show why they are particularly associated with canines.

Details

Identifiers
- Latin: dentes canini
- MeSH: D003481
- TA98: A05.1.03.005
- TA2: 907
- FMA: 55636

In mammalian oral anatomy, the canine teeth, also called cuspids, dogteeth, eye teeth, vampire teeth, or fangs, are the relatively long, pointed teeth. In the context of the upper jaw, they are also known as fangs. They can appear more flattened, however, causing them to resemble incisors and leading them to be called incisiform. They developed and are used primarily for firmly holding food in order to tear it apart, and occasionally as weapons. They are often the largest teeth in a mammal's mouth. Individuals of most species that develop them normally have four, two in the upper jaw and two in the lower, separated within each jaw by incisors; humans and dogs are examples. In most species, canines are the anterior-most teeth in the maxillary bone. The four canines in humans are the two upper maxillary canines and the two lower mandibular canines. They are specially prominent in dogs (Canidae), hence the name.

== Details ==
There are generally four canine teeth: two in the upper (maxillary) and two in the lower (mandibular) arch. A canine is placed laterally to (outside of) each lateral incisor and mesial to (inwards of) the premolars. They are larger and stronger than the incisors, and their roots sink deeply into the bones, causing well-marked prominences upon the surface. They are the only teeth in dentition with a single cusp, their crowns are roughly triangular from a mesial viewpoint and trapezoidal from a buccal viewpoint.

The crown is large and conical, very convex on its labial surface, a little hollowed and uneven on its lingual surface, and tapering to a blunted point or cusp, which projects beyond the level of the other teeth. The root is single, but longer and thicker than that of the incisors, conical in form, compressed laterally, and marked by a slight groove on each side. The lingual surface also presents two depressions on either side of the surface separated by a ridge in between; these depressions are known as mesial and distal lingual fossae.

=== Eruption ===
In humans, the upper canine teeth (popularly called eye teeth, from their position under the eyes) are larger and longer than the lower, and usually present a distinct basal ridge. Eruption typically occurs between the ages of eleven and twelve years for upper canines and between nine and ten years for lower canines. Upper deciduous canines, also known as the baby tooth, typically erupt between the ages of sixteen and twenty-two months and shed between ten and twelve years. Lower deciduous canines typically erupt between the ages of seventeen and twenty-two months and shed between nine and twelve years.

=== Developmental defects ===
Transposition (positional interchange of two adjacent teeth) is a development defect that is most commonly found in the permanent canine, with the maxillary being more commonly seen than mandibular. The upper canine frequently transposed with the first premolar whilst the lower canine transposed with the lateral incisor. Occasionally canines are congenitally missing.

=== Maxillary canine morphology ===
From a facial aspect, maxillary canines are approximately one millimetre narrower than the central incisor. Their mesial aspects resemble the adjacent lateral incisors, while their distal aspects anticipate the first premolars. They are slightly darker and more yellow in color than the other anterior teeth. From a lingual aspect, they have well-developed mesial and distal marginal ridges and a well-developed cingulum. A prominent lingual ridge divides the lingual aspect in half and creates the mesial and distal lingual fossae between the lingual ridge and the marginal ridges. From a proximal aspect, they resemble the incisors, but are more robust, especially in the cingulum region. Incisally, they are visibly asymmetrical, as the mesial incisal edge is slightly shorter than the distal incisal edge, which places the cusp slightly mesial to the long axis of the tooth. They are also thicker labiolingually than mesiodistally. Because of the disproportionate incisal edges, the contacts are also asymmetrical. Mesially, the contact sits at the junction of the incisal and middle third of the crown, while distally, the contact as more cervical, in the middle of the middle third of the crown. The root of the maxillary canines are the longest root of any tooth and conical in shape.

=== Mandibular canine morphology ===
The lower canine teeth are placed nearer the middle line than the upper, so that their summits correspond to the intervals between the upper canines and the lateral incisors. From a facial aspect, the mandibular canine is notably narrower mesiodistally than the maxillary one, the root is compressed mesiodistally with well-marked grooves on both sides and may be just as long as the maxillary (and at times bifurcated). A distinctive feature is the nearly straight outline this tooth has compared to the maxillary canine which is slightly more bowed. As in the maxillary canine, the mesial incisal edge (or cusp ridge) is shorter than the distal side, however, the cusp is displaced slightly lingual relative to the cusp of the maxillary canine.

Lingually, the surface of the tooth is much smoother compared to the very pronounced surface of the maxillary canine, and the cingulum is noted as less developed. The cusp may be lost with attrition over time and may resemble an upper second permanent incisor.

== Sexual dimorphism ==
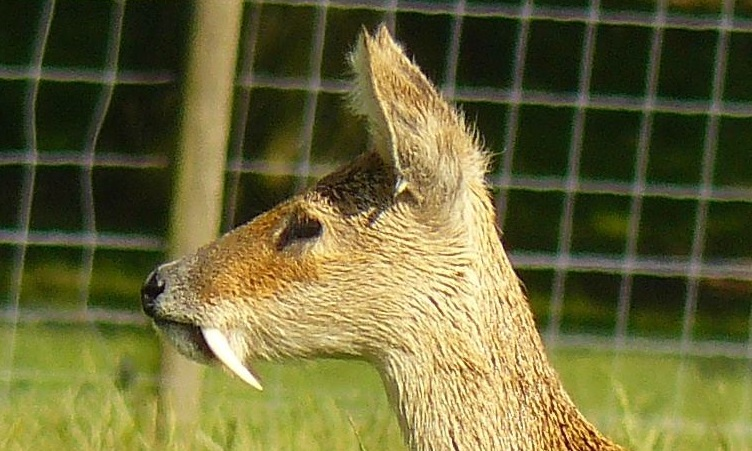
The sabre-tooth water deer of China and Korea is often called the vampire deer due to the exceptionally long canine teeth in the males.

In many species, the canine teeth in one or both jaws are much larger in males than in females, where they are sometimes hidden or completely absent. Animals showing this dimorphism include antelopes, musk-deer, camels, horses, wild boar, some apes, seals, narwhal, and walrus. Male dogs have larger canines with different contour than do females.

Humans have the proportionately smallest male canine teeth among all anthropoids and exhibit relatively little sexual dimorphism in canine tooth size. It has been proposed that the receding canine teeth in human males was likely to be a result of sexual selection for less aggressive partners by female humans. The dimorphism is also similarly less pronounced in bonobos and chimpanzees.

== Other animals ==
=== Synapsids ===
Canine teeth in synapsids

Skull of Dimetrodon, an early "pelycosaurian" synapsid with a single pair of canines in the upper jaw

Skull diagram of Jonkeria, a dinocephalian therapsid

Skull of Syodon, a dinocephalian therapsid

Canine teeth emerged early within the synapsid lineage (which includes mammals). In some "pelycosaurian" synapsids, multiple pairs of canine teeth were present in the upper jaw, but in therapsids (with the exception of Raranimus) only one pair of canines is present.

=== Non-synapsids ===
In non-synapsids, such as reptiles and crocodiles, teeth similar to canines may be termed "caniniform" ("canine-shaped") teeth. Teeth or appendages with similar appearances found in many snakes and invertebrates, such as spiders, are referred to as fangs, but are usually modified to inject venom.

== Additional images ==
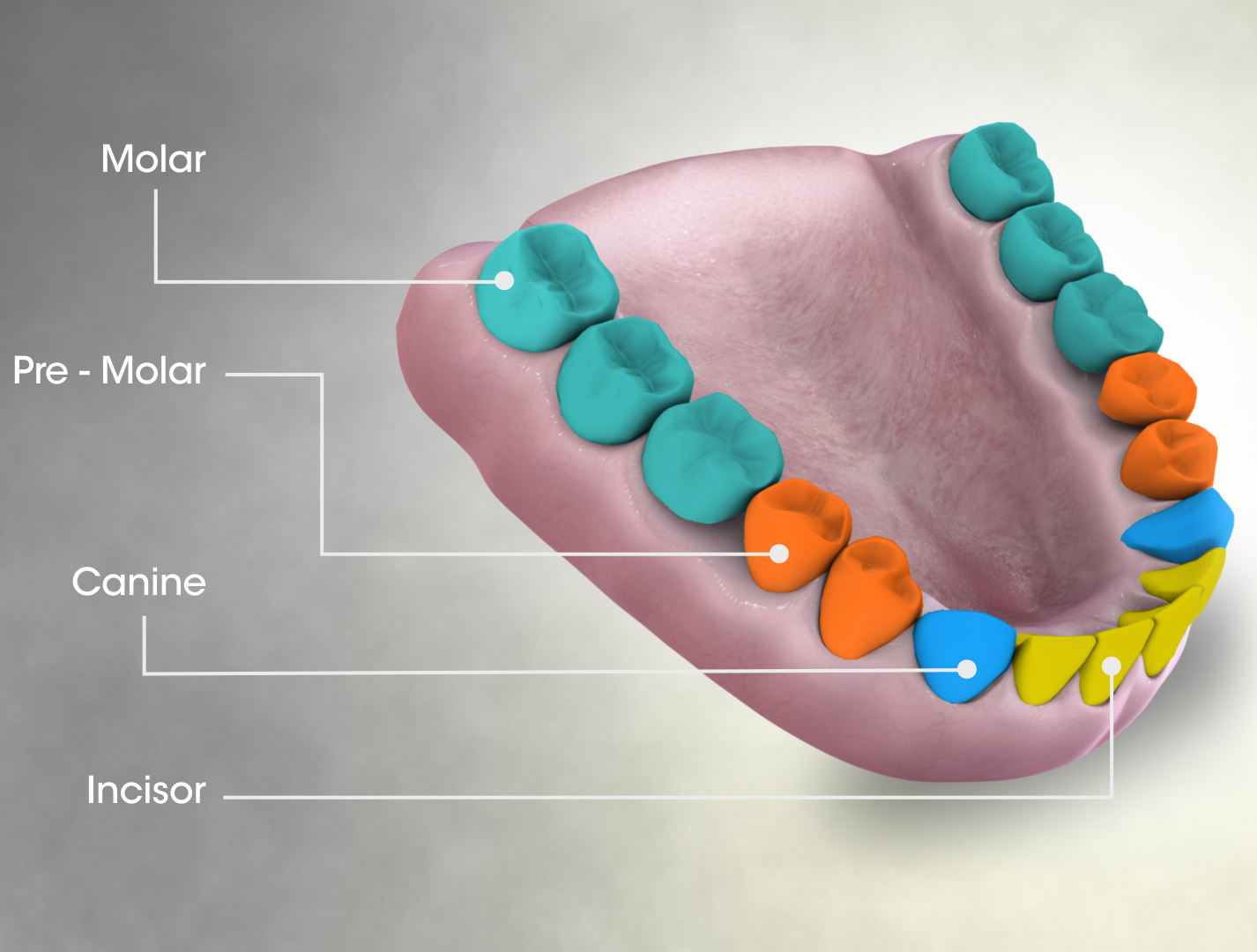
Medical animation showing Canine teeth and their arrangement in the mouth of an adult human being.

Mouth (oral cavity)

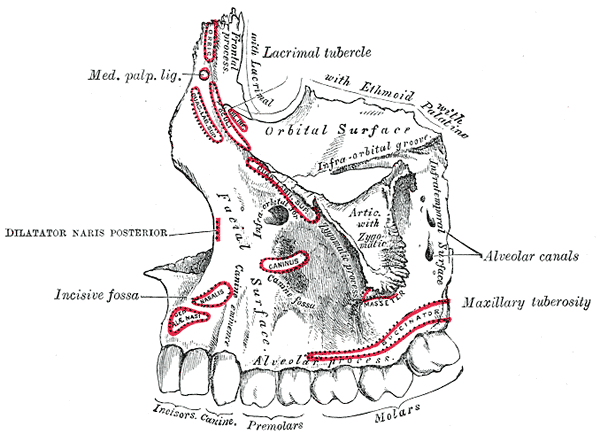
Left maxilla. Outer surface.

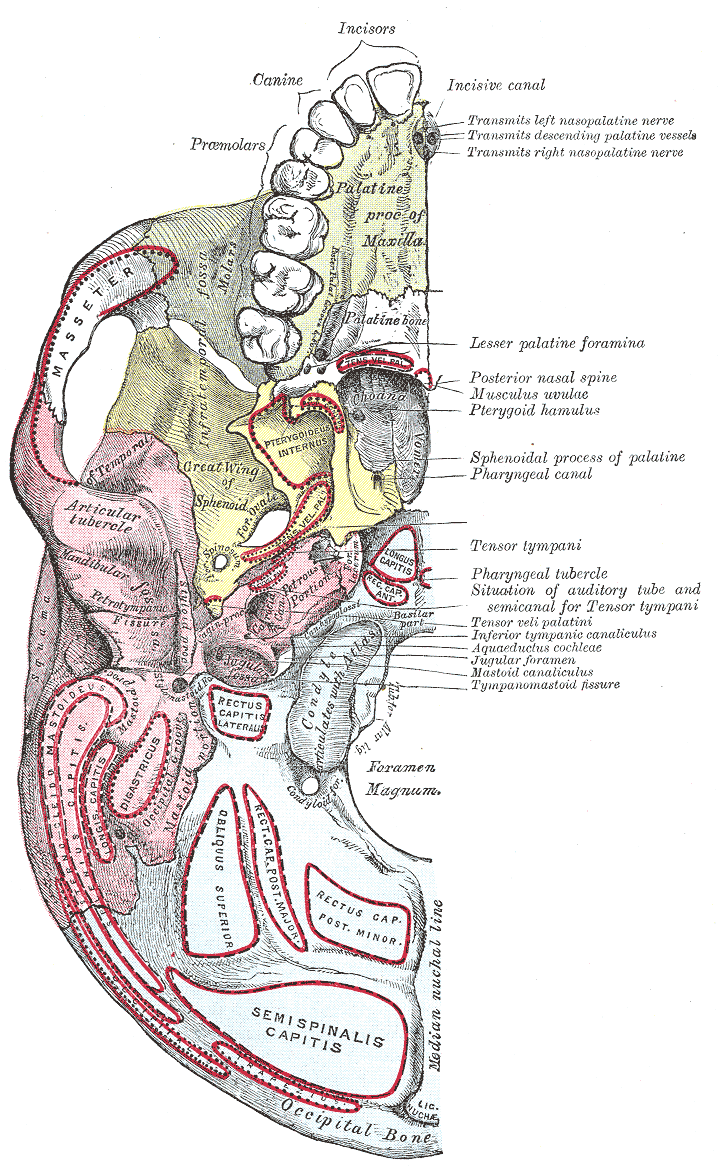
Base of skull. Inferior surface.

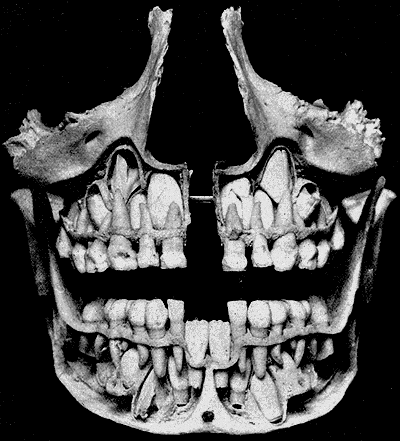
Unerupted permanent teeth underlie the deciduous teeth.

== See also ==
- Carnassial
- Incisor
- Molar
- Premolar
