= Lewis offset =

Mandibular right first molar.

The Lewis offset is a term for the portion of the central groove on a permanent mandibular first molar which lies between the two central pits, known as the Pits of Cameron. It was named for long time dental anatomy instructor Dr. Christopher S. Lewis, a Mercer Island, WA dentist.

== Details ==
The offset lies at an angle to the mesio-distal axis of the tooth, and causes the mesial portion of the central groove to be located further buccally than the distal portion. This buccolingual shift correlates with a relative difference in size between the mesial and distal cusps on these teeth - the mesiolingual cusp is larger than the mesiobuccal cusp, but the distobuccal cusp is larger than the distolingual cusp. It also allows for the buccal groove to be located mesial to the lingual groove which is mandatory to accommodate the relative sizes of the three cusps on the buccal and two cusps on the lingual of the occlusal surface of the tooth.
