= Mandibular second molar =

Human tooth

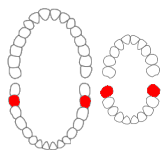

Identifiers
- FMA: 290277

The mandibular second molar is the tooth located distally (away from the midline of the face) from both the mandibular first molars of the mouth but mesial (toward the midline of the face) from both mandibular third molars. This is true only in permanent teeth. The function of this molar is similar to that of all molars in regard to grinding being the principal action during mastication, commonly known as chewing. Though there is more variation between individuals than that of the first mandibular molar, there are usually four cusps on mandibular second molars: two on the buccal (side nearest the cheek) and two lingual (side nearest the tongue). There are great differences between the deciduous (baby) mandibular molars and those of the permanent mandibular molars, even though their function is similar. The permanent mandibular molars are not considered to have any teeth that precede them. Despite being named molars, the deciduous molars are followed by permanent premolars.

In the universal system of notation, the deciduous mandibular second molars are designated by a letter written in uppercase. The right deciduous mandibular second molar is known as "T", and the left one is known as "K". The international notation has a different system of notation. Thus, the right deciduous mandibular second molar is known as "85", and the left one is known as "75".

In the universal system of notation, the permanent mandibular second molars are designated by a number. The right permanent mandibular second molar is known as "31", and the left one is known as "18". In the Palmer notation, a number is used in conjunction with a symbol designating in which quadrant the tooth is found. For this tooth, the left and right second molars would have the same number, "7", but the right one would have the symbol, "┐", underneath it, while the left one would have, "┌". The international notation has a different numbering system from the previous two, and the right permanent mandibular second molar is known as "47", and the left one is known as "37".

== Eruption ==
The age at which the permanent mandibular second molar erupts varies between populations, and it usually erupts slightly earlier than the maxillary second molar. In a cross-sectional study of 807 schoolchildren aged 11–15 years in Thrissur district, Kerala, India, the mean age of children in whom the tooth had erupted was 12.32 years for the right mandibular second molar and 12.39 years for the left, compared with about 12.7 years for the maxillary second molars. The tooth had erupted in about 62% of children aged 11–12 years and in over 99% of those aged 14–15 years. Because of this variation, eruption of the second molar is used in forensic age estimation only alongside other age indicators.
