= Universal Numbering System =

American dental notation system

Universal numbering system. This is a dental practitioner view, so tooth number 1, the rear upper tooth on the patient's right, appears on the left of the chart.

The Universal Numbering System, sometimes called the American system, is a dental notation system commonly used in the United States.

Most of the rest of the world uses the FDI World Dental Federation notation, accepted as an international standard by the International Standards Organization as ISO 3950. However, dentists in the United Kingdom commonly still use the older Palmer notation despite the difficulty in representing its graphical components in computerized (non-handwritten) records.

== Left and right ==
Dental charts are normally arranged from the viewpoint of a dental practitioner facing a patient. The patient's right side appears on the left side of the chart, and the patient's left side appears on the right side of the chart.

The labels "right" and "left" on the charts in this article correspond to the patient's right and left, respectively.

== Universal numbering system ==
Although it is named the "universal numbering system", it is also called the "American system" as it is only used in the United States. The uppercase letters A through T are used for primary teeth and the numbers 1 - 32 are used for permanent teeth. The tooth designated "1" is the maxillary right third molar ("wisdom tooth") and the count continues along the upper teeth to the left side. Then the count begins at the mandibular left third molar, designated number 17, and continues along the bottom teeth to the right side. Each tooth has a unique number or letter, allowing for easier use on keyboards.

Universal numbering system table
Permanent dentition
upper right								upper left							
1	2	3	4	5	6	7	8	9	10	11	12	13	14	15	16
32	31	30	29	28	27	26	25	24	23	22	21	20	19	18	17
lower right								lower left							
Primary dentition
upper right								upper left							
			A	B	C	D	E	F	G	H	I	J			
			T	S	R	Q	P	O	N	M	L	K			
lower right								lower left							
Alternate system for primary dentition
upper right								upper left							
			1d	2d	3d	4d	5d	6d	7d	8d	9d	10d			
			20d	19d	18d	17d	16d	15d	14d	13d	12d	11d			
lower right								lower left							

== Tooth numbering ==
Comparison of alphanumeric notation, Palmer notation, ISO 3950 (FDI) notation, Universal Numbering System, and paleoanthropology notation

Permanent teeth and their assigned numbers (Universal Tooth Numbering System)

Upper right

1. 3rd molar (wisdom tooth)
2. 2nd molar (12-yr molar)
3. 1st molar (6-yr molar)
4. 2nd bicuspid (2nd premolar)
5. 1st bicuspid (1st premolar)
6. Cuspid (canine/eye tooth)
7. Lateral incisor
8. Central incisor

Upper left

9. Central incisor
10. Lateral incisor
11. Cuspid (canine/eye tooth)
12. 1st bicuspid (1st premolar)
13. 2nd bicuspid (2nd premolar)
14. 1st molar (6-yr molar)
15. 2nd molar (12-yr molar)
16. 3rd molar (wisdom tooth)

Lower left

17. 3rd molar (wisdom tooth)
18. 2nd molar (12-yr molar)
19. 1st molar (6-yr molar)
20. 2nd bicuspid (2nd premolar)
21. 1st bicuspid (1st premolar)
22. Cuspid (canine/eye tooth)
23. Lateral incisor
24. Central incisor

Lower right

25. Central incisor
26. Lateral incisor
27. Cuspid (canine/eye tooth)
28. 1st bicuspid (1st premolar)
29. 2nd bicuspid (2nd premolar)
30. 1st molar (6-yr molar)
31. 2nd molar (12-yr molar)
32. 3rd molar (wisdom tooth)

== See also ==
- Dental notation
- FDI World Dental Federation notation
- Palmer Notation Method
