= Maxillary first molar =

Human tooth

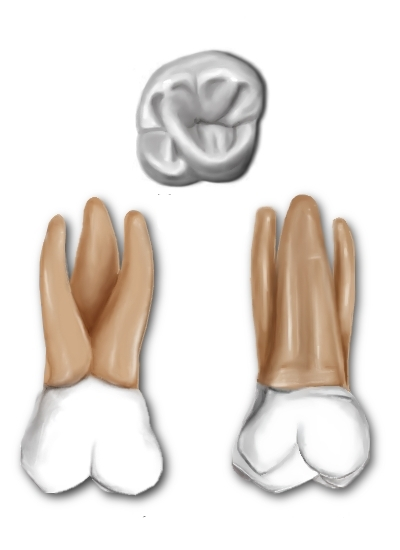
- Maxillary first molar

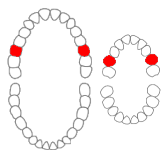
- Maxillary first molars of permanent and primary teeth marked in red.

Identifiers
- FMA: 290269

The maxillary first molar is the human tooth located laterally (away from the midline of the face) from both the maxillary second premolars of the mouth but mesial (toward the midline of the face) from both maxillary second molars.

The function of this molar is similar to that of all molars in regard to grinding being the principal action during mastication, commonly known as chewing.

There are usually four cusps on maxillary molars, two on the buccal (side nearest the cheek) and two palatal (side nearest the palate). There may also be a fifth smaller cusp on the palatal side known as the Cusp of Carabelli.

Normally, maxillary molars have four lobes, two buccal and two lingual, which are named in the same manner as the cusps that represent them (mesiobuccal, distobuccal, mesiolingual, and distolingual lobes). Unlike the anterior teeth and premolars, molars do not exhibit facial developmental depressions. Evidence of lobe separation can be found in the central groove, which divides buccal from lingual lobes. The two lingual lobes are separated by the distolingual groove, and the two buccal lobes are divided by the buccal groove.

There are great differences between the deciduous (baby) maxillary molars and those of the permanent maxillary molars, even though their function are similar. The permanent maxillary molars are not considered to have any teeth that precede it. Despite being named molars, the deciduous molars are followed by permanent premolars.

== Notation ==
Permanent maxillary first molar notation

In the universal numbering system, one number is used to identify the tooth. The right permanent maxillary first molar is known as tooth "3", and the left permanent maxillary first molar is known as tooth "14".

In the Palmer notation, a number and symbol are used to identify the tooth. The number identifies the tooth position relative to the midline, and the symbol identifies the quadrant of the mouth. Both maxillary first molars have the same number; 6. However, the right molar has the symbol "┘" underneath it. The left molar has "└" underneath it.

In the international system of notation two numbers are used to identify the tooth. The first number identifies the quadrant of the mouth. The second number identifies the tooth relative to the midline of the arch. The right permanent maxillary first molar is known as "16". The left permanent maxillary first molar is known as "26".

Deciduous maxillary first molar notation

In the universal numbering system, an uppercase letter is used to identify the tooth. The right deciduous maxillary first molar is known as "B", and the left one is known as "I".

In the Palmer notation, a letter and symbol are used to identify the tooth. The letter identifies the tooth position relative to the midline, and the symbol identifies the quadrant of the mouth. Both maxillary first molars have the same letter; "D". However, the right molar has the symbol "┘" underneath it. The left molar has "└" underneath it.

In the international system of notation two numbers are used to identify the tooth. The right deciduous maxillary first molar is known as "54", and the left one is known as "64".

== External root morphology ==
The maxillary first molar normally has three roots.

- The mesiobuccal root is broad distobuccal and has prominent depressions or flutings on its mesial and distal surfaces. The internal canal morphology is highly variable, but the majority of the mesiobuccal roots contain two canals.
- The distobuccal root is generally rounded or ovoid in cross section and usually contains a single canal.
- The palatal root is more broad mesiodistally than buccolingually and ovoidal in shape but normally contains only a single canal. Although the palatal root generally appears straight on radiographs, there is usually a buccal curvature in the apical third. Depressions on the buccal and palatal surfaces of the palatal root can be present but are generally shallow.

There are prominent depressions found on the distal aspect of the mesiobuccal roots. Depressions can also be found on the furcal side of the distobuccal and palatal roots.

The overall average length of the maxillary first molar is 20.5 mm with an average crown length of 7.5 mm and an average root length of 13 mm.

== Pathologies ==
The maxillary first molars are the second most common carious teeth and the second most common teeth to undergo endodontic treatment or extraction (with mandibular first molars the most common diseased teeth). Up to 21% of all extracted teeth are maxillary first molars.
