= Maxillary canine =

Type of tooth

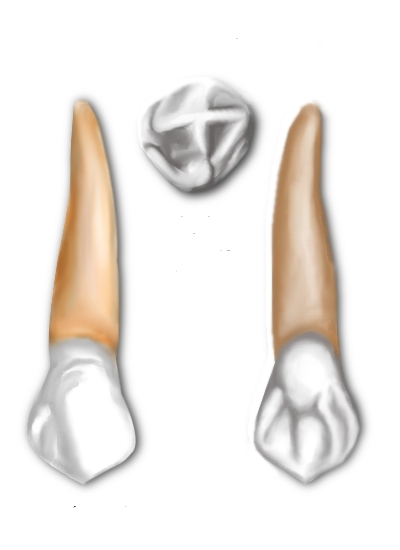
- Maxillary canine

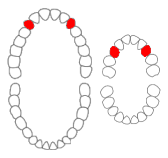
- Maxillary canines of permanent and primary teeth marked in red

Identifiers
- FMA: 290214

In human dentistry, the maxillary canine is the tooth located laterally (away from the midline of the face) from both maxillary lateral incisors of the mouth but mesial (toward the midline of the face) from both maxillary first premolars. Both the maxillary and mandibular canines are called the "cornerstone" of the mouth because they are all located three teeth away from the midline, and separate the premolars from the incisors. The location of the canines reflects their dual function as they complement both the premolars and incisors during mastication, commonly known as chewing. Nonetheless, the most common action of the canines is tearing of food. The canines often erupt in the upper gums several millimeters above the gum line. The canine teeth are able to withstand the tremendous lateral pressure caused by chewing. There is a single cusp on canines, and they resemble the prehensile teeth found in carnivorous animals such as the extinct saber-toothed cat. Though relatively the same, there are some minor differences between the deciduous (baby) maxillary canine and that of the permanent maxillary canine.

It is the longest tooth in total length (from the root to the incisal edge) in the mouth. Canines are also the only anterior teeth with a cusp.

Maxillary canines begin to calcify by 4 months of age. The enamel of the tooth is completely formed by around 6 to 7 years of age and the permanent maxillary canines erupt at around 11 to 12 years of age. The root is completely formed by 13 to 15 years of age. The maxillary canine teeth are slightly wider than the mandibular canine teeth. The maxillary canines have one root, usually the longest root of any tooth in the mouth.

== Notation ==
In the universal system of notation, the deciduous maxillary canines are designated by a letter written in uppercase. The right deciduous maxillary canine is known as "C" and the left one "H". In international notation, the right deciduous maxillary canine is known as "53" and the left one "63".

In the universal system of notation, the permanent maxillary canines are referred to by numbers. The right permanent maxillary canine is known as "6" and the left "11". In the Palmer notation, a number is used in conjunction with a symbol designating in which quadrant the tooth is found. For this tooth, the left and right canines would have the same number, "3", but the right is designated with the symbol "┘" under the number, and the left one likewise with "└". The international notation has a different numbering system from the other two, and the right permanent maxillary canine is known as "13" and the left "23".
