= Maxillary first premolar =

Upper teeth on the sides of the mouth

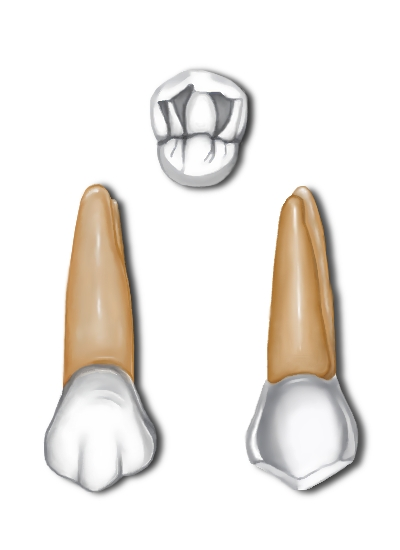
- Maxillary first premolar

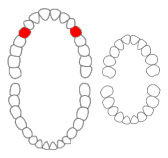
- Maxillary first premolar

Identifiers
- FMA: 55801

The maxillary first premolar is one of two premolars that exist in the maxilla. Premolars are only found in the adult dentition and typically erupt at the age of 10–11, replacing the first molars in primary dentition. The maxillary first premolar is located behind the canine and in front of the second premolar. Its function is to bite and chew food.

== Notation ==
For Palmer notation, the right maxillary premolar is known as “4⏌” and the left maxillary premolar is known as “⎿4”. For FDI notation, the right maxillary premolar is known as “14” and the left maxillary premolar is known as “24”. In the U.S. Universal Numbering System the maxillary right first premolar is number "5" and the maxillary left first premolar is number "12".

== Tooth morphology ==
The maxillary first premolar has two well-defined cusps, a buccal cusp and a lingual cusp, with the buccal cusp often 1mm taller than the lingual cusp, giving the tooth an angular crown. This crown is broader buccolingually than mesiodistally, resulting in a characteristic hexagonal or six-sided shape when viewed from the occlusal aspect.

It is typically characterised by two roots and two root canals, with the buccal root often larger than the lingual root. A study by Olczak et al. (2022) found that from 226 participants, 69.1% of maxillary first premolars had two roots, 28.3% had one root, and 2.6% had three roots.

== Crown morphology ==
=== Buccal aspect ===
The maxillary first premolar has a convex buccal surface with a prominent buccal ridge extending from the cusp tip to the cervical margin. Shallow depressions divide the surface into three lobes (mesiobuccal, distobuccal, and buccal lobes), with well-defined mesiobuccal and distobuccal line angles. The buccal cusp is slightly distal, giving the crown an asymmetrical appearance.

=== Lingual aspect ===
The lingual surface is narrower than the buccal surface, with a shorter, less defined lingual cusp. The lingual cusp lacks significant grooves or depressions, having a smooth and convex shape. The lingual cusp ridge extends toward the central groove of the occlusal surface, and both the buccal and lingual cusp tips are visible from this view.

=== Mesial and distal aspects ===
The crown has a hexagonal occlusal outline, with a broader buccolingual than mesiodistal dimension, while the mesiobuccal and distobuccal sides are almost equal in length. The occlusal surface is bordered by marginal ridges and has a central groove running buccolingually, ending in mesial and distal pits. These pits connect to additional grooves, forming triangular fossae on either side.

== Root morphology ==
The maxillary first premolar usually has two roots, although a single root with two canals is also possible. When two roots are present, the buccal root tends to be more prominent while the lingual root is shorter and smoother. The roots typically bifurcate near the apical third of the root structure.

== Root canal system ==
The anatomy of the root canals follows the external outline of the two slender roots. The palatal canal is usually larger in dimension than the buccal canal, and the root canals may curve towards the buccal aspect as they conform to the root outline. The shape of the root canal varies at different levels: it is very wide buccolingually at the cervical level, slightly ovoid at the midroot level, and round at the apical third.

The maxillary first premolar typically has two roots, buccal and palatal, each housing its own canal, which follow the outline of the respective root. The palatal canal is generally larger than the buccal canal. The root canals often curve towards the buccal aspect, following the root's natural contour. Their cross sectional shapes vary along the root length:

- Cervical third: Broad buccolingually, often presenting as long oval, flat, or irregular shapes
- Middle third: Generally oval or long oval
- Apical third: Typically round or oval

The maxillary first premolar has a pulp chamber that is significantly wider buccolingually than mesiodistally. Studies indicate that approximately 70% of maxillary first premolars contain two root canals with separate foramina, while less than 10% possess a single canal and foramen. About 5% of these teeth may show three canals, generally associated with additional root branches, and the remaining specimens commonly exhibit two canals that unite in the apical third, exiting through a single foramen.

The occlusal outline of the pulp chamber includes two pulp horns: the larger buccal horn and the smaller lingual horn. Its cross-section is kidney-shaped due to the mesial concavity of the root, with the lingual orifice generally larger than the buccal orifice. When three canals are present, the external outline of the tooth becomes triangular, with the base positioned on the buccal aspect.

== Development and eruption ==
Maxillary first premolar generally erupts between 10 and 11 years old. The erupting maxillary canine can significantly influence the positioning of both the lateral incisor and first premolar.

The developmental timeline of the maxillary first premolar follows a structured sequence. The initiation of calcification for the maxillary first premolar occurs between 1½ and 1¾ years of age. The enamel is fully formed between the ages of 5 and 6, which is followed by eruption into the oral cavity typically around 10 to 11 years. Finally, root development completes between 12 and 13 years.

== Function ==
The maxillary first premolar functions similarly to other premolars by assisting the canines in gripping and tearing food, and supporting the molars in grinding during mastication. Along with the first molars and other premolars, maxillary first premolars perform most of the chewing function.

== Pathology ==
=== Periodontal disease ===
Variations in the root morphology of maxillary first premolars can make periodontal treatment more challenging and contribute to the progression of periodontal disease. These difficulties arise mainly from the presence of root concavities, which can complicate oral hygiene efforts.

Maxillary first premolars frequently exhibit a mesial root concavity, present in nearly 100% of cases, and a distal root concavity in about 40% of cases. Mesial concavity, often referred to as furcal concavity or developmental concavity, is typically found at the cemento-enamel junction, and can extend toward the furcation roof or along the interproximal surfaces.

These concavities tend to trap food particles and plaque, promoting the buildup of calculus. As a result, cleaning these areas thoroughly is difficult, increasing the risk of periodontal disease. Studies have shown that teeth with mesial root concavities often exhibit deeper periodontal probing depths and greater attachment loss compared to teeth without such features. While mesial concavities provide structural advantages such as improved torque resistance and attachment area, they facilitate plaque retention, especially after attachment loss, thus accelerating periodontal disease progression.
