= Mandibular canine =

Lower tooth in the front of the mouth

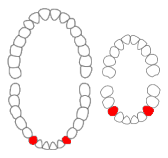
- Mandibular canines of permanent and primary teeth marked in red.

Identifiers
- FMA: 290216

The mandibular canine is the tooth located distally (away from the midline of the face) from both mandibular lateral incisors of the mouth but mesially (toward the midline of the face) from both mandibular first premolars. Both the maxillary and mandibular canines are called the "cornerstone" of the mouth because they are all located three teeth away from the midline, and separate the premolars from the incisors. The location of the canines reflect their dual function as they complement both the premolars and incisors during mastication, commonly known as chewing. Nonetheless, the most common action of the canines is tearing of food. The canine teeth are able to withstand the tremendous lateral pressures from chewing. There is a single cusp on canines, and they resemble the prehensile teeth found in carnivorous animals. Though relatively the same, there are some minor differences between the deciduous (baby) mandibular canine and that of the permanent mandibular canine.

The mandibular canines begin to show calcification at age 4 months and the enamel of the crown is completely formed by age 7 years. The permanent mandibular canines erupt at around 9 to 10 years of age. The mandibular and maxillary canines are the longest teeth in the mouth. The root of the mandibular canine, which is fully formed by age 13, is the longest in the mandibular arch. The mandibular canines are slightly narrower than the maxillary canines but its crown is as long and sometimes is longer. The mandibular canines usually have only one root, but sometimes the root may be bifurcated, or have two roots. When it does, one root faces the tongue (lingual side) and one will face the lip (labial side).

In the universal system of notation, the deciduous mandibular canines are designated by a letter written in uppercase. The right deciduous mandibular canine is known as "R", and the left one is known as "M". The international notation has a different system of notation. Thus, the right deciduous mandibular canine is known as "83", and the left one is known as "73".

In the universal system of notation, the permanent mandibular canines are designated by a number. The right permanent mandibular canine known as "27", and the left one is known as "22". In the Palmer notation, a number is used in conjunction with a symbol designating in which quadrant the tooth is found. For this tooth, the left and right canines would have the same number, "3", but the right one would have the symbol, "┐", over it, while the left one would have, "┌". The international notation has a different numbering system than the previous two, and the right permanent mandibular canine is known as "43", and the left one is known as "33".
