= Mandibular lateral incisor =

Lower teeth at the front of the mouth

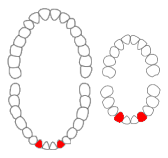
- Mandibular lateral incisors of permanent and primary teeth marked in red.

Identifiers
- FMA: 290197

The mandibular lateral incisor is the tooth located distally (away from the midline of the face) from both mandibular central incisors of the mouth and mesially (toward the midline of the face) from both mandibular canines. As with all incisors, their function is for shearing or cutting food during mastication, commonly known as chewing. There are no cusps on the teeth. Instead, the surface area of the tooth used in eating is called an incisal ridge or incisal edge. Though relatively the same, there are some minor differences between the deciduous (baby) mandibular lateral incisor and that of the permanent mandibular lateral incisor.

In the universal system of notation, the deciduous mandibular lateral incisors are designated by a letter written in uppercase. The right deciduous mandibular lateral incisor is known as "Q", and the left one is known as "N". The international notation has a different system of notation. Thus, the right deciduous mandibular lateral incisor known as "82", and the left one is known as "72".

In the universal system of notation, the permanent mandibular lateral incisors are designated by a number. The right permanent mandibular lateral incisor is known as "26", and the left one is known as "23". In the Palmer notation, a number is used in conjunction with a symbol designating in which quadrant the tooth is found. For this tooth, the left and right lateral incisors would have the same number, "2", but the right one would have the symbol, "┐", over it, while the left one would have, "┌". The international notation has a different numbering system than the previous two, and the right permanent mandibular lateral incisor is known as "42", and the left one is known as "32".
