= Mandibular second premolar =

Human tooth

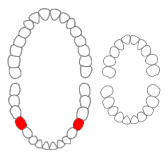
- Mandibular second premolars of permanent teeth marked in red. There are no premolars in primary teeth.

Identifiers
- FMA: 55804

The mandibular second premolar is the tooth located distally (away from the midline of the face) from both the mandibular first premolars of the mouth but mesial (toward the midline of the face) from both mandibular first molars. The function of this premolar is assist the mandibular first molar during mastication, commonly known as chewing. Mandibular second premolars have three cusps. There is one large cusp on the buccal side (closest to the cheek) of the tooth. The lingual cusps (located nearer the tongue) are well developed and functional (which refers to cusps assisting during chewing). Therefore, whereas the mandibular first premolar resembles a small canine, the mandibular second premolar is more alike to the first molar. There are no deciduous (baby) mandibular premolars. Instead, the teeth that precede the permanent mandibular premolars are the deciduous mandibular molars.

Anatomy: The mandibular second premolar most commonly has three cusps but can have two as well. The three cusp variety has one large cusp on the buccal with two smaller lingual cusps. The mesiolingual cusp is twice the size of the distolingual cusp. Viewed from the occlusal (looking down onto the biting surface of the tooth) the tooth is rather square in outline, particularly on the lingual. The occlusal table (the area bounded by the cusps, cusp ridges, and marginal ridges) is rectangular. The groove pattern is shaped like a “Y” with the tail pointed to the lingual and placed between the distolingual and mesiolingual cusps one third of the distance form the distal to the mesial. The contacts with the adjacent teeth are positioned buccal to the midpoint. Viewed from the buccal the buccal cusp tip is centered mesiodistally. The buccal cusp ridges exhibit slight concavities that extend over the buccal surfaces as developmental grooves into the gingival embrasure. The contacts with adjacent teeth are in the occlusal third of the tooth with the distal height of contour slightly closer to the gingival than the mesial height of contour. The root is generally straight with slight curvature to the distal in the apical third. Viewed from the mesial or distal the buccal height of contour is in the gingival third of the tooth. The lingual height of contour is in the middle third of the tooth (not the middle third of the lingual cusp). When divided into thirds from the buccal height of contour to the lingual height of contour, the buccal cusp is at the contact between the buccal and middle thirds and the central groove is at the contact of the middle and lingual thirds. The two cusp variety generally has a groove pattern shaped like a “U” or “H”. Viewed from the occlusal it is more rounded in general and its lingual cusp is positioned slightly to the mesial, while the occlusal table remains squared. Viewed from the buccal the buccal cusp is centered over the root as in the three cusp variety. Viewed from the mesial or distal its heights of contour are similar to the three cusp variety.

Sometimes, premolars are referred to as bicuspids. Even though the terms are synonymous, "bicuspid" refers to having two functional cusps, and the mandibular second premolar is an example of a premolar with three functional cusps. Thus, "biscupid" is technically not as accurate as "premolar".

In the universal system of notation, the permanent mandibular premolars are designated by a number. The right permanent mandibular second premolar is known as "29", and the left one is known as "20". In the Palmer notation, a number is used in conjunction with a symbol designating in which quadrant the tooth is found. For this tooth, the left and right second premolars would have the same number, "5", but the right one would have the symbol, "┐", over it, while the left one would have, "┌". The international notation has a different numbering system than the previous two, and the right permanent mandibular second premolar is known as "45", and the left one is known as "35".

It is a very common condition in orthodontics for a patient to have one or both mandibular second premolars congenitally absent.
