= Mandibular central incisor =

Human tooth

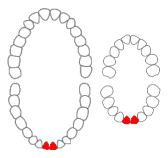
- Mandibular central incisors of permanent and primary teeth marked in red.

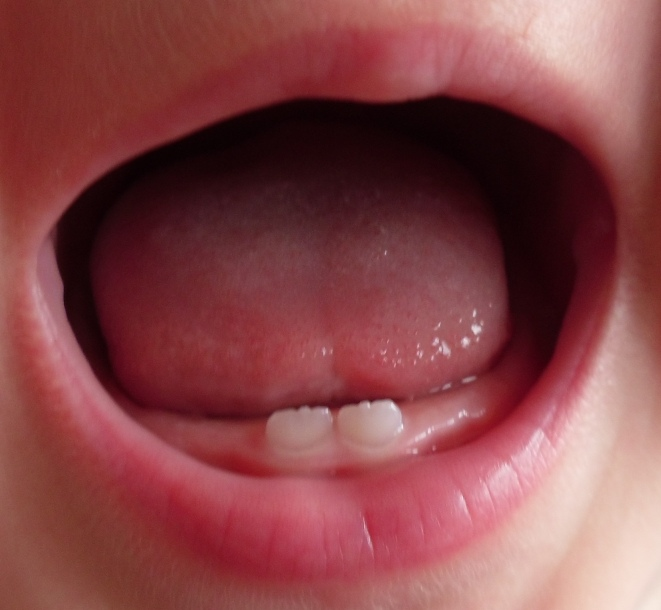
- The deciduous mandibular central incisors in a 7-month-old infant. Note the incisal ridges which give the teeth a serrated appearance.

Identifiers
- FMA: 290182

The mandibular central incisor is the tooth located on the jaw, adjacent to the midline of the face. It is mesial (toward the midline of the face) from both mandibular lateral incisors. As with all incisors, its function includes shearing or cutting food during mastication, commonly known as chewing. There are no cusps on the tooth. Instead, the surface area of the tooth used in eating is called an incisal ridge or incisal edge. Though the two are similar, there are some minor differences between the deciduous (baby) mandibular central incisor and that of the permanent mandibular central incisor. The mandibular central incisors are usually the first teeth to appear in the mouth, typically around the age of 6–8 months.

== Notation ==
In the Universal Numbering System, the deciduous mandibular central incisors are designated by a letter written in uppercase. The right deciduous mandibular central incisor is known as "P", and the left one is known as "O". The international notation has a different system of notation. Thus, the right deciduous mandibular central incisor is known as "81", and the left one is known as "71".

In the universal system of notation, the permanent mandibular central incisors are designated by a number. The right permanent mandibular central incisor is known as "25", and the left one is known as "24". In the Palmer notation, a number is used in conjunction with a symbol designating in which quadrant the tooth is found. For this tooth, the left and right central incisors would have the same number, "1", but the right one would have the symbol, "┐", over it, while the left one would have, "┌". The international notation has a different numbering system than the previous two, and the right permanent mandibular central incisor is known as "41", and the left one is known as "31".

== Anatomy ==
The central incisors have fossa on their lingual surfaces. Their mesial and distal proximal contacts are located in the incisal third. The facial and lingual heights of contour are in the cervical third, as is the case with all incisors and canines.
