= Maxillary second molar =

Upper teeth at the back of the mouth

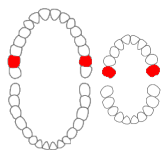
- Maxillary second molars of permanent and primary teeth marked in red.

Identifiers
- FMA: 290271

The maxillary second molar is the tooth located distally (away from the midline of the face) from both the maxillary first molars of the mouth but mesial (toward the midline of the face) from both maxillary third molars. This is true only in permanent teeth. In deciduous (baby) teeth, the maxillary second molar is the last tooth in the mouth and does not have a third molar behind it. The function of this molar is similar to that of all molars in regard to grinding being the principal action during mastication, commonly known as chewing. There are usually four cusps on maxillary molars, two on the buccal (side nearest the cheek) and two palatal (side nearest the palate).

There are great differences between the deciduous (baby) maxillary molars and those of the permanent maxillary molars, even though their function are similar. The permanent maxillary molars are not considered to have any teeth that precede it. Despite being named molars, the deciduous molars are followed by permanent premolars. The deciduous maxillary second molar is the most likely deciduous tooth to have an oblique ridge.

In the universal system of notation, the deciduous maxillary second molars are designated by a letter written in uppercase. The right deciduous maxillary second molar is known as "A", and the left one is known as "J". The international notation has a different system of notation. Thus, the right deciduous maxillary second molar is known as "55", and the left one is known as "65".

In the universal system of notation, the permanent maxillary second molars are designated by a number. The right permanent maxillary second molar is known as "2", and the left one is known as "15". In the Palmer notation, a number is used in conjunction with a symbol designating in which quadrant the tooth is found. For this tooth, the left and right second molars would have the same number, "7", but the right one would have the symbol, "┘", underneath it, while the left one would have, "└". The international notation has a different numbering system than the previous two, and the right permanent maxillary second molar is known as "17", and the left one is known as "27".
