= Molar (tooth) =

Large tooth at the back of the mouth

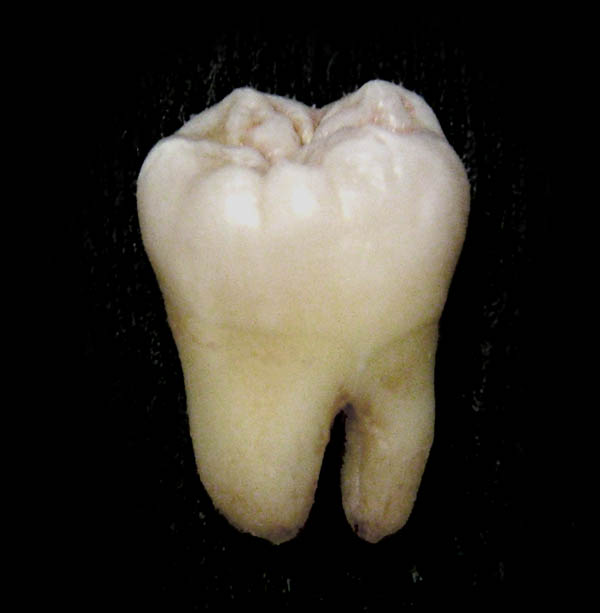
- A lower wisdom tooth after extraction.

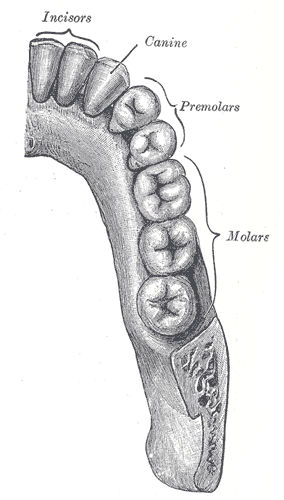
- Permanent teeth of right half of lower dental arch, seen from above: In this diagram, a healthy wisdom tooth (third, rearmost molar) is included

Details
- Artery: Posterior superior alveolar artery

Identifiers
- Latin: dentes molares
- MeSH: D008963
- TA98: A05.1.03.007
- TA2: 910
- FMA: 55638

The molars or molar teeth are large, flat teeth at the back of the mouth. They are more developed in mammals. They are used primarily to grind food during chewing. The name molar derives from Latin, molaris dens, meaning "millstone tooth", from mola, millstone and dens, tooth. Molars show a great deal of diversity in size and shape across the mammal groups. The third molar of humans is sometimes vestigial.

== Human anatomy ==
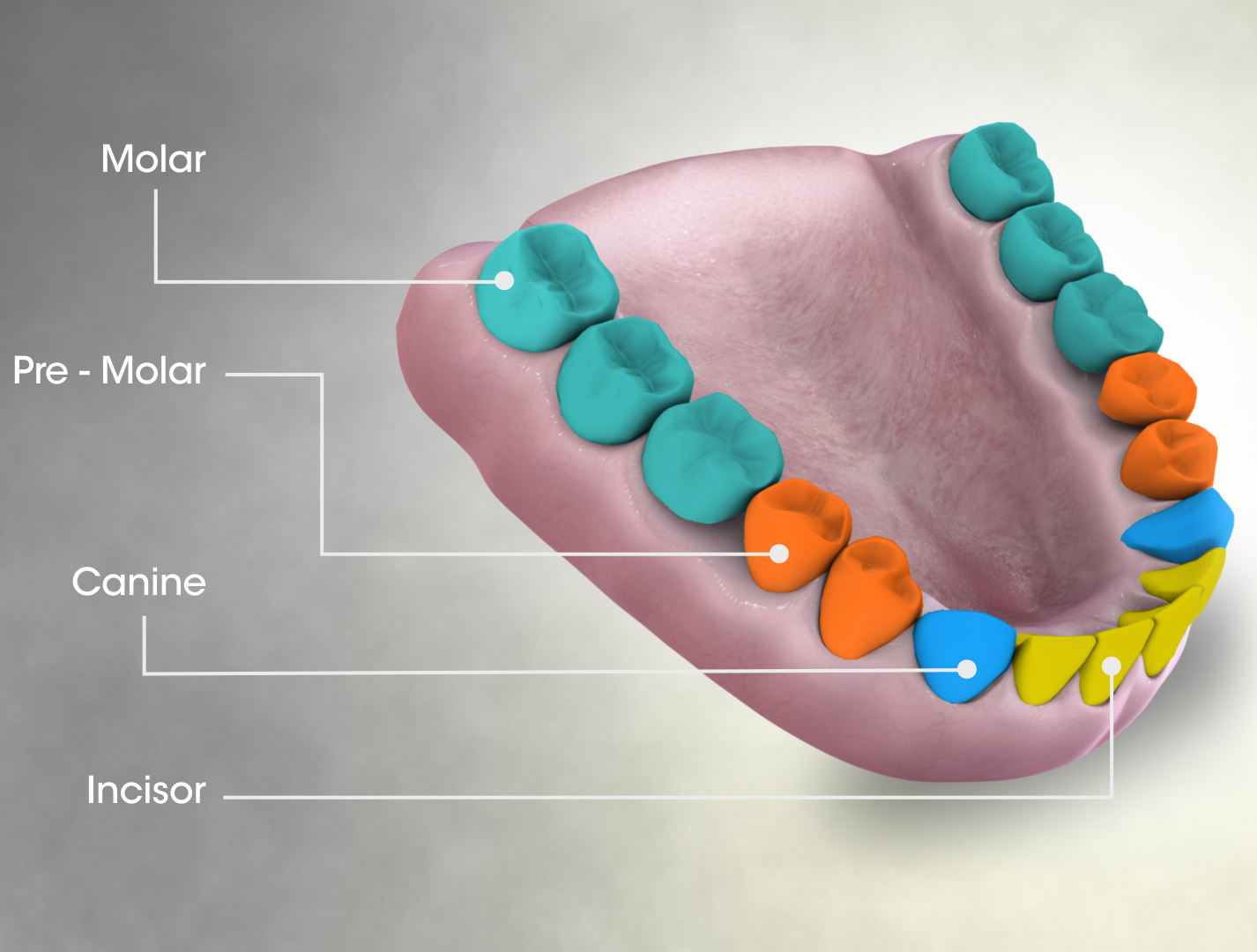
Image showing the arrangement of teeth in the mouth of an adult human

In humans, the molar teeth have either four or five cusps. Adult humans have 12 molars, in four groups of three at the back of the mouth. The third, rearmost molar in each group is called a wisdom tooth. It is usually the last tooth to appear, breaking through the front of the gum at about the age of 20, although this varies among individuals and populations, and in many cases the tooth is missing.

The human mouth contains upper (maxillary) and lower (mandibular) molars. They are: maxillary first molar, maxillary second molar, maxillary third molar, mandibular first molar, mandibular second molar, and mandibular third molar.

== Mammal evolution ==
In mammals, the crown of the molars and premolars is folded into a wide range of complex shapes. The basic elements of the crown are the more or less conical projections called cusps and the valleys that separate them. The cusps contain both dentine and enamel, whereas minor projections on the crown, called crenulations, are the result of different enamel thickness. Cusps are occasionally joined to form ridges and expanded to form crests. Cingula are often incomplete ridges that pass around the base of the crown.

Mammalian, multicusped cheek teeth probably evolved from single-cusped teeth in synapsids, although the diversity of therapsid molar patterns and the complexity in the molars of the earliest mammals make determining how this happened impossible. According to the widely accepted "differentiation theory", additional cusps have arisen by budding or outgrowth from the crown, while the rivalling "concrescence theory" instead proposes that complex teeth evolved by the clustering of originally separate conical teeth. Therian mammals (placentals and marsupials) are generally agreed to have evolved from an ancestor with tribosphenic cheek teeth, with the upper molar having three main cusps arranged in a triangle.

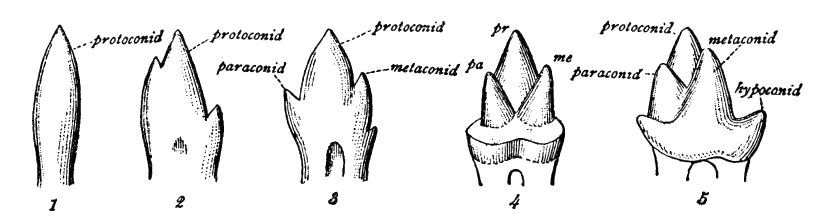
Comparison of right lower cheek teeth, as seen in lingual view, in various taxa: 1, a single-cusped pelycosaur; 2, Dromatherium (a Triassic cynodont); 3, Microconodon (a Triassic eucynodont); 4, Spalacotherium (a Cretaceous "symmetrodont"); 5, Amphitherium (a Jurassic prototribosphenid mammal)

== Morphology ==
Each major cusp on an upper molar is called a cone and is identified by a prefix dependent on its relative location on the tooth: proto-, para-, meta-, hypo-, and ento-. Suffixes are added to these names: -id is added to cusps on a lower molar (e.g., protoconid); -ule to a minor cusp on the upper molar, and -ulid to a minor cusp on the lower molar (e.g., protoconulid). A shelf-like ridge on the lower part of the crown (on an upper molar) is called a cingulum; the same feature on the lower molar a cingulid, and a minor cusp on these, for example, would be a cingular cuspule or conulid.

=== Tribosphenic ===
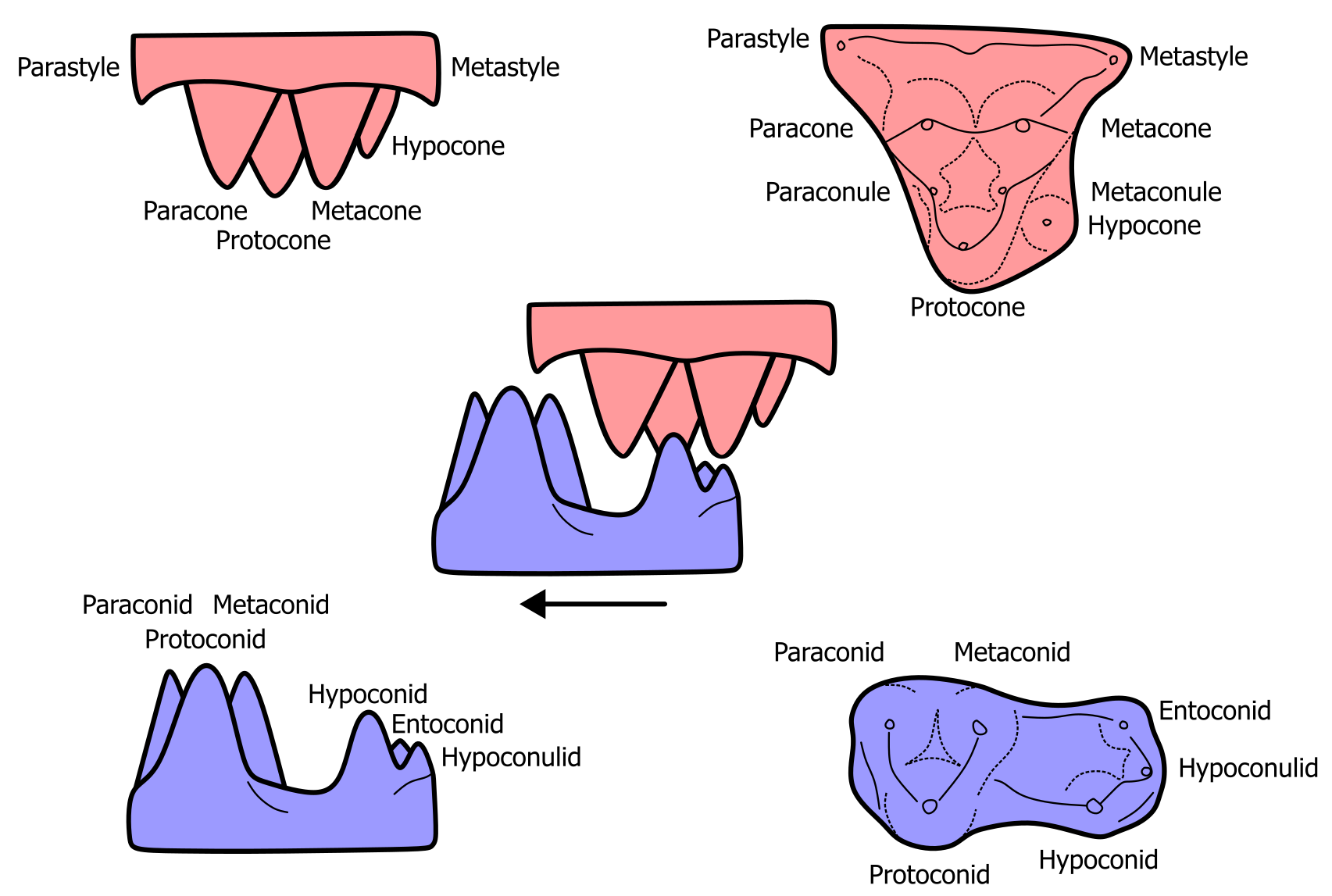
A diagram of generalized tribosphenic molars with notable features labelled. Upper left molar in pink, lower left molar in blue. The front of each tooth is towards the left of the image and the teeth are shown in labial view (left three insets) or occlusal view (right two insets).

The design that is considered one of the most important characteristics of therian mammals is called a tribosphenic molar. Among living mammals, the tribosphenic tooth is found in most insectivorous mammals as well as young platypuses, even though adult platypuses are toothless. Other living mammal tooth shapes are modified from tribosphenic ancestors.

In tribosphenic teeth, the lower molar is divided into two regions: the three-cusped trigonid, or shearing/piercing end, and the talonid, or crushing heel. In modern tribosphenic molars, the trigonid is towards the front of each tooth and the talonid is towards the rear. The trigonid is defined by three large cusps: the protoconid is on the buccal/labial (cheek) side of the tooth, while the anterior paraconid and posterior metaconid are on the lingual (tongue) side. The rear edge of the talonid may be defined by a crest or a series of cusps, such as the hypoconid (on the cheek side) and the entoconid (on the tongue side).

Generalized tribosphenic left upper molar seen from below, showing the protocone, paracone, and metacone. The mesial (front) side of the tooth is towards the top of the image, and the lingual (tongue) side is towards the left of the image.

Upper molars look like three-pointed mountain ranges, with their features mirrored from the lower molars. The protocone cusp is on the lingual side of the tooth, while the anterior paracone and posterior metacone are on the buccal side. The protocone of the upper molar and talonid basin of the lower molar mesh together as a crushing system similar to a mortar and pestle.

Tribosphenic molars were present in the direct ancestors of all three living mammal groups, but it was most likely not ancestral to mammals as a whole. Many paleontologists argue that it developed independently in monotremes (from australosphenidans), rather than being inherited from a common ancestor that they share with marsupials and placentals (from boreosphenidans); this idea still has some critics. For example, the dentition of the Early Cretaceous monotreme Steropodon is similar to those of Peramus and dryolestoids, which suggests that monotremes are related to some pre-tribosphenic mammals, but, on the other hand, the status of neither of these two groups is well-established.

Some Jurassic mammaliaforms, such as docodonts and shuotheriids, have "reversed tribosphenic" molars, in which a talonid-like structure develops towards the front of the lower molar, rather than towards the rear. This variant is regarded as an example of convergent evolution.

=== Quadrate ===
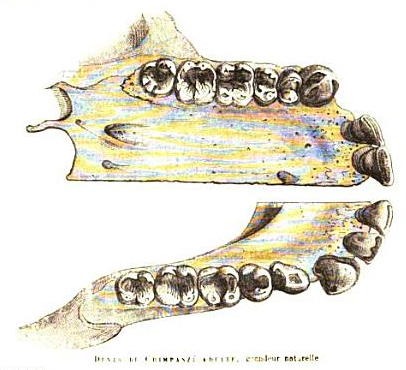
Upper and lower dentition of a chimpanzee, a mammal with molars which are quadrate and bunodont.

From the primitive tribosphenic tooth, molars have diversified into several unique morphologies. In many groups, a fourth cusp evolved in the upper molars. Quadrate (also called quadritubercular or euthemorphic) molars have a hypocone, an additional fourth cusp on the lingual (tongue) side of the upper molar, located posterior to the protocone. Quadrate molars appeared early in mammal evolution and are present in many species, including hedgehogs, raccoons, and many primates, including humans. There may be a fifth cusp.

In many mammals, additional smaller cusps called conules (in the upper teeth) or conulids (in the lower teeth) appear between the larger cusps. They are named after their locations, e.g. a paraconule is located between a paracone and a metacone, a hypoconulid is located between a hypoconid and an entoconid.

=== Bunodont ===
In bunodont molars, the cusps are low and rounded hills rather than sharp peaks or crests. They are most common among omnivores such as pigs, bears, and humans. Bunodont molars are effective crushing devices and are often basically quadrate in shape.

=== Zalambdodont ===
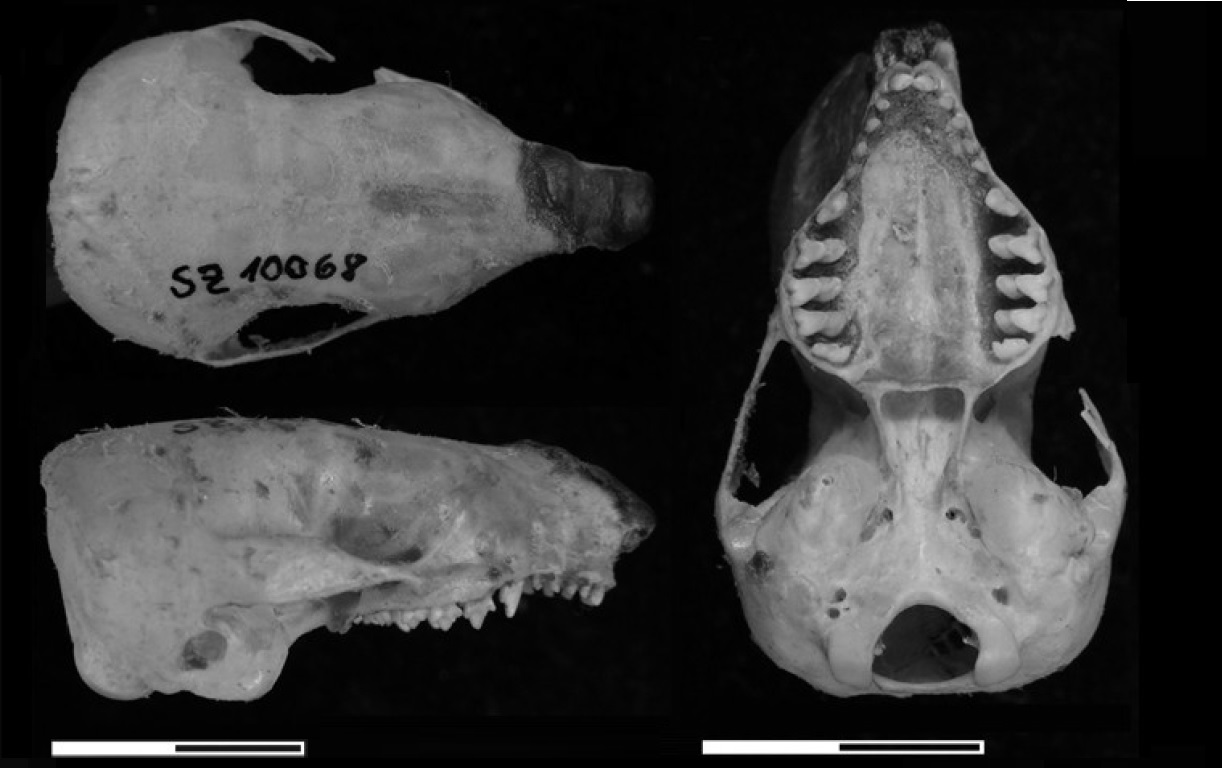
The cranium of the Southern marsupial mole (Notoryctes typhlops), showing its zalambdodont molars with V-shaped ectolophs

Zalambdodont upper molars have at least three main cusps, one larger on the lingual side and two smaller on the labial side. The two labial cusps are located on an expanded shelf called the stylar shelf. The large lingual cusp is joined to the other two by crests, forming a narrow V- or λ (lambda)-shaped shearing edge (known as an ectoloph) when seen from below. The term "zalambdodont" roughly translates to "very lambda-toothed". Zalambdodont molars are found in tenrecs, golden moles, solenodons, and marsupial moles among living mammals.

Though superficially similar to tribosphenic molars, zalambdodont teeth are actually derived from a different arrangement of cusps. In zalambdodont placentals, the larger inner cusp is homologous with the paracone of a tribosphenic upper molar, while the metacone is absent, reduced or fused. Marsupial moles show the opposite condition, with the large cusp equivalent to the metacone, and the paracone absent instead. The protocone is either absent (as in some golden moles and tenrecs) or reduced to a small fourth cusp, positioned lingual to the large cusp, inwards from the tip of the V.

In the lower molars, the talonid region is reduced or absent, having lost its role as a crushing basin against the protocone. Zalambdodonty reduces tooth contact to a few simple shearing surfaces, though the evolutionary advantage of this tooth type is unclear.

=== Dilambdodont ===
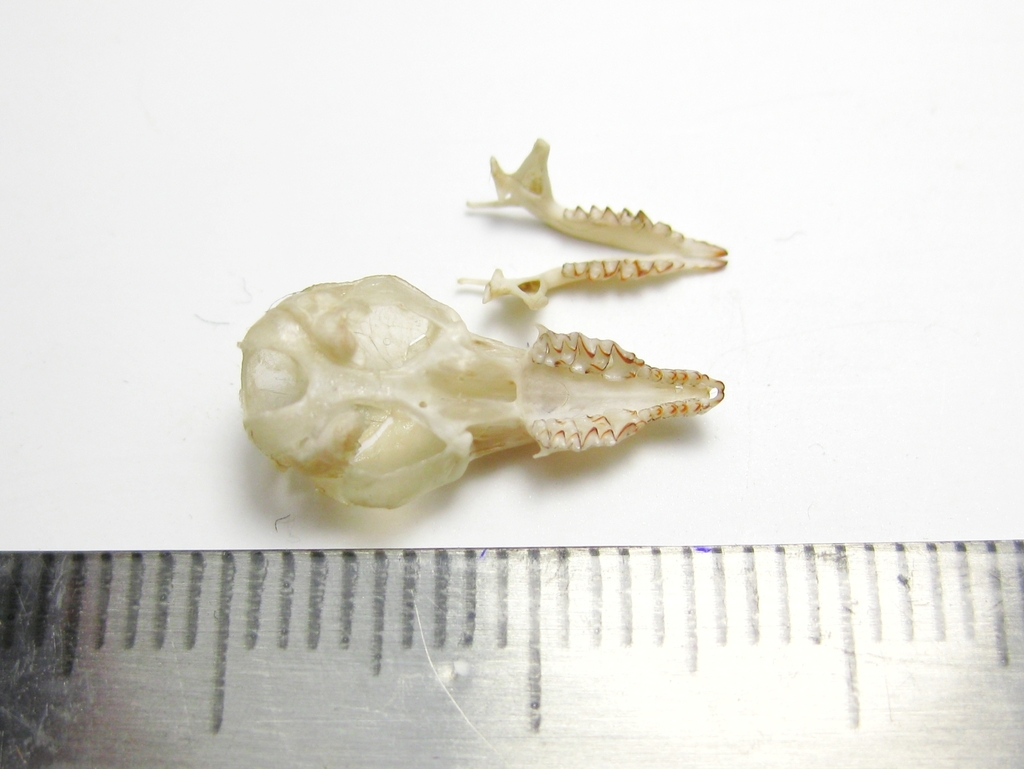
The skull of a Caucasian pygmy shrew (Sorex volnuchini), showing its dilambdodont molars with W-shaped ectolophs.

Like zalambdodont molars, dilambdodont molars have a distinct ectoloph, but this shearing surface is shaped like two lambdas or a W when seen from below. On the lingual side, at the bottom of the W, are the metacone and paracone, while the labial side hosts three points of contact with the stylar shelf. A protocone is present lingual to the ectoloph. Dilambdodont molars are present in shrews, moles, and some insectivorous bats. They can also occur in herbivorous mammals.

=== Lophodont ===
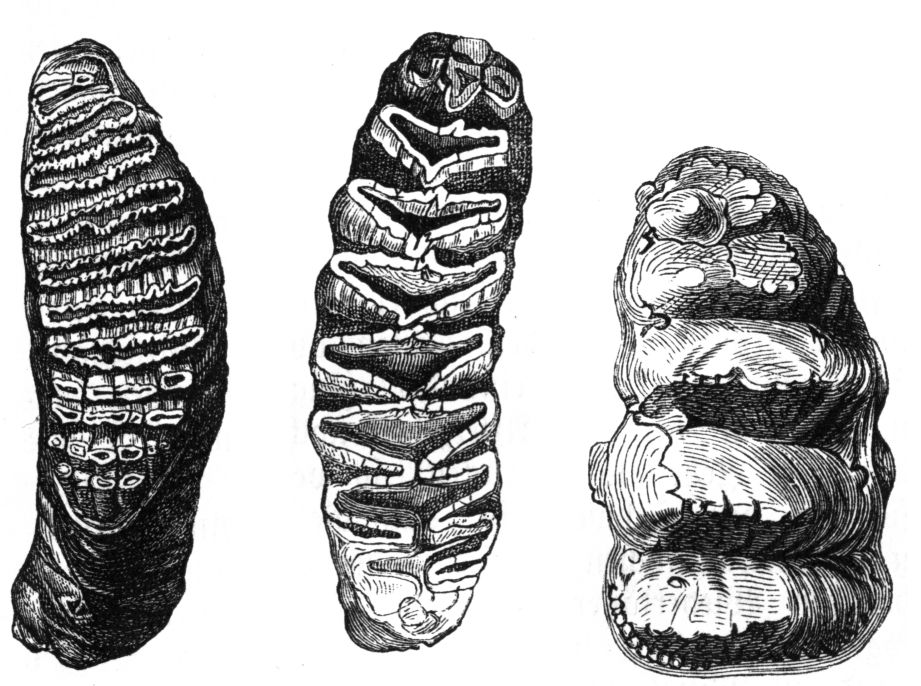
Loxodont molars of Elephas (left) and Loxodonta (center), compared to the zygodont mastodon (right)

Lophodont teeth are easily identified by the differentiating patterns of ridges or lophs of enamel interconnecting the cusps on the crowns. Present in most herbivores, these patterns of lophs can be a simple, ring-like edge, as in mole rats, or a complex arrangement of series of ridges and cross-ridges, as those in odd-toed ungulates, such as equids.

Lophodont molars have hard and elongated enamel ridges called lophs oriented either along or perpendicular to the dental row. Lophodont molars are common in herbivores that grind their food thoroughly. Examples include tapirs, manatees, and many rodents.

When two lophs form transverse, often ring-shaped, ridges on a tooth, the arrangement is called bilophodont. This pattern is common in primates, but can also be found in lagomorphs (hares, rabbits, and pikas) and some rodents. Further development of lophodonty can extend to three transverse lophs (trilophodonty), or transverse lophs linking a series of cusps (zygodonty)

An extreme form of lophodonty, with numerous closely-spaced lophs in a washboard-like pattern, is known as loxodonty. Loxodonty is seen in living elephants and some rodents (such as capybaras and Otomys). The African elephant belongs to a genus called Loxodonta because of this feature.

=== Selenodont ===
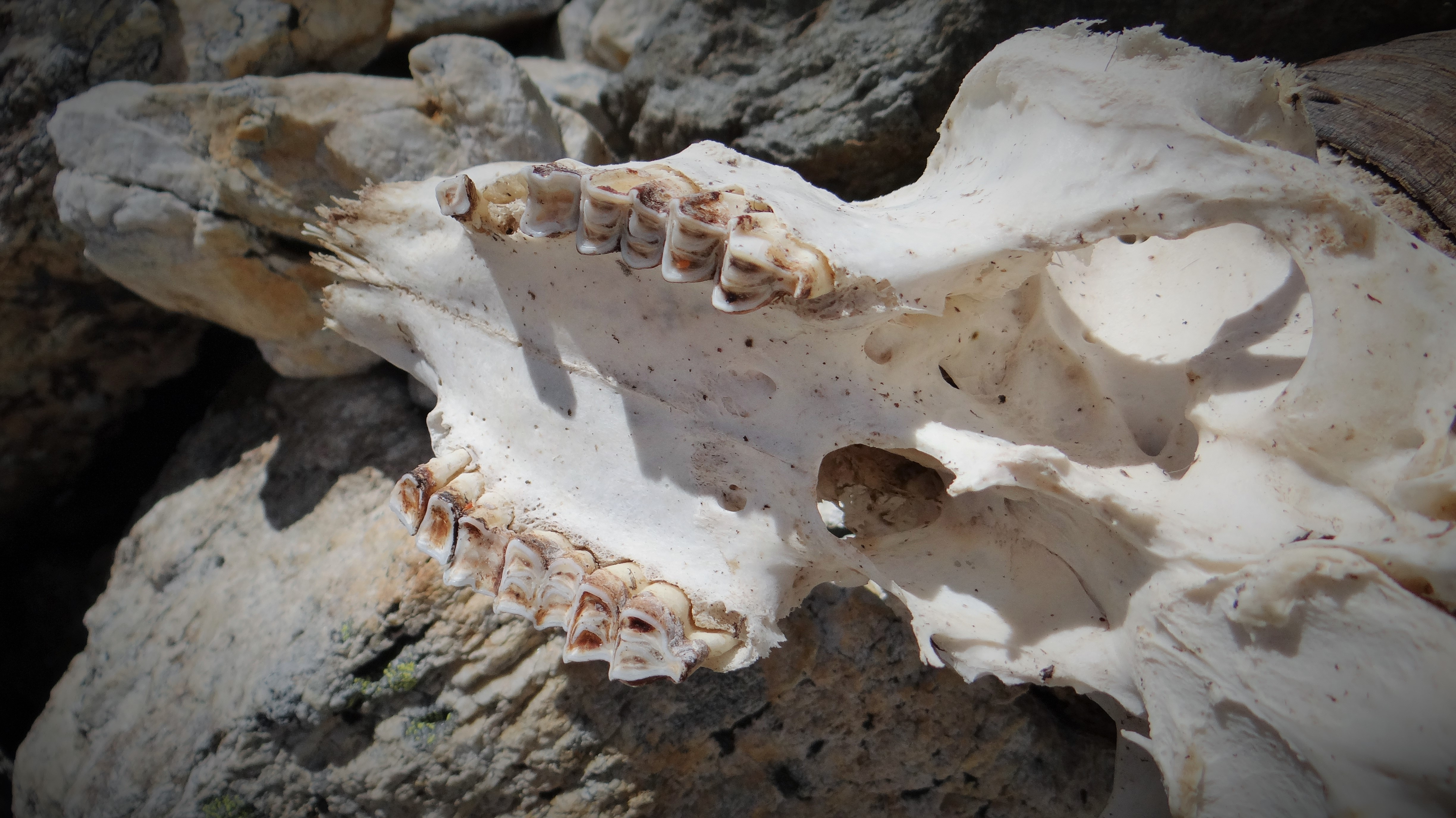
The skull of an ibex, showing the stacked crescent-shaped cusps of its selenodont molar teeth

In selenodont molars (so-named after moon goddess Selene), major cusps are elongated into crescent-shaped ridges aligned from front-to-back on the tooth. Examples include most even-toed ungulates, such as cattle and deer. Some mammal teeth are intermediate between selenodont, lophodont, or bunodont teeth, so terms like "bunoselenodont", "lophoselenodont", and "bunolophodont" are often used for teeth which are not fully in one category or another.

=== Secodont ===
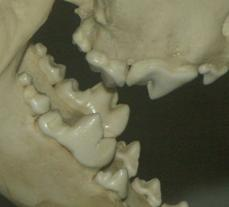
Carnassials of a Eurasian wolf

Many carnivorous mammals have enlarged and blade-like teeth especially adapted for slicing and chopping. These teeth have sharp edges and narrow cusps aligned into a straight row from front-to-back. Blade-like mammal teeth are generally known as secodont teeth, though some secodont teeth are better known by other names.

Carnivorans, the most abundant group of living carnivorous mammals, modify their fourth upper premolar and first lower molar into notched secodont teeth known as carnassials. Some herbivorous marsupials and extinct mammals have a large serrated premolar tooth known as a plagiaulacoid, which may be an adaptation for sawing through tough seeds and insect exoskeletons.

=== Crown height ===
==== Hypsodont ====
Hypsodont dentition is characterized by high-crowned teeth and enamel that extends far past the gum line, which provides extra material for wear and tear. Some examples of animals with hypsodont dentition are cattle and horses, all animals that feed on gritty, fibrous material. Hypsodont molars can continue to grow throughout life, for example in some species of Arvicolinae (herbivorous rodents such as voles and lemmings).

Hypsodont molars lack both a crown and a neck. The occlusal surface is rough and mostly flat, adapted for crushing and grinding plant material. The body is covered with cementum both above and below the gingival line, below which is a layer of enamel covering the entire length of the body. The cementum and the enamel invaginate into the thick layer of dentin.

==== Brachydont ====
The opposite condition to hypsodont is called brachydont or brachyodont (from brachys 'short'). It is a type of dentition characterized by low-crowned teeth. Human teeth are brachydont.

A brachydont tooth has a crown above the gingival line and a neck just below it, and at least one root. A cap of enamel covers the crown and extends down to the neck. Cementum is only found below the gingival line. The occlusal surfaces tend to be pointed, well-suited for holding prey and tearing and shredding.

== See also ==
- Dental formula
- Dental anthropology
- Polyphyodont
