= Mandibular first premolar =

Lower teeth on the sides of the mouth

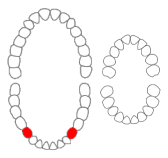
- Mandibular first premolars of permanent teeth marked in red. There are no premolars in primary teeth.

Identifiers
- FMA: 55803

The mandibular first premolar is the tooth located laterally (away from the midline of the face) from both the mandibular canines of the mouth but mesial (toward the midline of the face) from both mandibular second premolars. The function of this premolar is similar to that of canines in regard to tearing being the principal action during mastication, commonly known as chewing. Mandibular first premolars have two cusps. The one large and sharp is located on the buccal side (closest to the cheek) of the tooth. Since the lingual cusp (located nearer the tongue) is small and nonfunctional (which refers to a cusp not active in chewing), the mandibular first premolar resembles a small canine. There are no deciduous (baby) mandibular premolars. Instead, the teeth that precede the permanent mandibular premolars are the deciduous mandibular molars.

Sometimes, premolars are referred to as bicuspids. Even though the terms are synonymous, "bicuspid" refers to having two functional cusps, and the mandibular first premolar is an example of a premolar with only one functional cusp. Thus, "bicuspid" is technically not as accurate as "premolar".

In the universal system of notation, the permanent mandibular premolars are designated by a number. The right permanent mandibular first premolar is known as "28", and the left one is known as "21". In the Palmer notation, a number is used in conjunction with a symbol designating in which quadrant the tooth is found. For this tooth, the left and right first premolars would have the same number, "4", but the right one would have the symbol, "┐", over it, while the left one would have, "┌". The international notation has a different numbering system than the previous two, and the right permanent mandibular first premolar is known as "44", and the left one is known as "34".
