= Palmer notation =

Tooth numbering system

Palmer notation (sometimes called the military system) is a dental notation system (tooth numbering system) named for 19th-century American dentist Corydon Palmer from Warren, Ohio. Despite the adoption of the FDI World Dental Federation notation (ISO 3950) in most of the world and by the World Health Organization, the Palmer notation continued to be the overwhelmingly preferred method used by orthodontists, dental students and practitioners in the United Kingdom as of 1998.

The notation was originally termed the Zsigmondy system after Hungarian dentist Adolf Zsigmondy, who developed the idea in 1861 using a Zsigmondy cross to record quadrants of tooth positions. Adult teeth were numbered 1 to 8, and the child primary dentition (also called deciduous, milk or baby teeth) were depicted with a quadrant grid using Roman numerals I, II, III, IV, V to number the teeth from the midline. Palmer changed this to A, B, C, D, E, which made it less confusing and less prone to errors in interpretation.

The Palmer notation consists of a symbol (⏌⎿ ⏋⎾) designating in which quadrant the tooth is found and a number indicating the position from the midline. Adult teeth are numbered 1 to 8, with deciduous (baby) teeth indicated by a letter A to E. Hence the left and right maxillary central incisors would have the same number, "1", but the right one would have the symbol "⏌" underneath it, while the left one would have "⎿".

Comparison of alphanumeric notation, Palmer notation, ISO 3950 (FDI) notation, Universal Numbering System, and paleoanthropology notation

== Table of codes ==
Orientation of the chart is traditionally "dentist's view", i.e. patient's right corresponds to notation chart left. The designations "left" and "right" on the chart, however, nonetheless correspond to the patient's left and right, respectively.

Palmer notation
Permanent Dentition
upper right								upper left							
^{8}⏌	^{7}⏌	^{6}⏌	^{5}⏌	^{4}⏌	^{3}⏌	^{2}⏌	^{1}⏌	⎿^{1}	⎿^{2}	⎿^{3}	⎿^{4}	⎿^{5}	⎿^{6}	⎿^{7}	⎿^{8}
_{8}⏋	_{7}⏋	_{6}⏋	_{5}⏋	_{4}⏋	_{3}⏋	_{2}⏋	_{1}⏋	⎾_{1}	⎾_{2}	⎾_{3}	⎾_{4}	⎾_{5}	⎾_{6}	⎾_{7}	⎾_{8}
lower right								lower left							
Primary Dentition
upper right								upper left							
			^{E}⏌	^{D}⏌	^{C}⏌	^{B}⏌	^{A}⏌	⎿^{A}	⎿^{B}	⎿^{C}	⎿^{D}	⎿^{E}			
			_{E}⏋	_{D}⏋	_{C}⏋	_{B}⏋	_{A}⏋	⎾_{A}	⎾_{B}	⎾_{C}	⎾_{D}	⎾_{E}			
lower right								lower left							

One advantage of Palmer notation is that it can produce a very graphical image, akin to a 'map' of the dentition; tooth transpositions or edentulous spaces can easily be depicted if desired. It would also be feasible to introduce additional alphabetic characters or other symbols, for example to denote supernumerary teeth or bridge pontics, to which a purely numerical method such as the FDI system does not lend itself easily.

Palmer notation for an upper right first premolar tooth

Palmer notation for a deciduous lower right central incisor tooth

Palmer notation for a normal adult full set of teeth

Palmer notation for a normal child full set of teeth

== Computerization ==
With the move from written dental notes to electronic records, some difficulty in reproducing the symbols has been encountered. On a standard keyboard 'slash' and 'backslash' may be used as a crude approximation to the symbols with numbers placed before or afterwards; hence 3/ is ^{3}⏌ and /5 is ⎾_{5}.

The Miscellaneous Technical block in Unicode provides Palmer notation symbols in U+23BE through U+23CC. The symbols are not to be confused with box-drawing characters (┘└ ┐┌), which have the horizontal line at the middle. These symbols are inherited from JIS X 0213 Dentist symbols.

Daniel Johnson has put together a Palmer Tooth Notation TrueType font called FreePalmer. It is covered by the GPL 3 license. This font is descended from FreeSans. It can be used in OpenOffice and other software. A "MP7" derivative which enables the grid patterns to be produced that correspond to handwritten Palmer tooth notations is available for download as well. The FreePalmer characters are placed in the Latin-1 part, overriding existing characters. A more technically correct way would be to program orthographic ligatures into the font.

== Victor Haderup notation (Danish variant) ==
The Danish dentist Victor Haderup devised a variation of the Palmer notation where the (⏌⎿ ⏋⎾) symbols are replaced by plus/minus signs, which can either be placed in front or behind the number. A plus (+) indicates upper position while minus (−) indicates lower. When the sign is in front of the number, it indicates left while after it indicates right. For instance −6 indicates the 6th lower left tooth, i.e. first mandibular molar.

== See also ==
- Dental notation
- FDI World Dental Federation notation
- Universal numbering system
