= Human tooth development =

Process by which teeth form

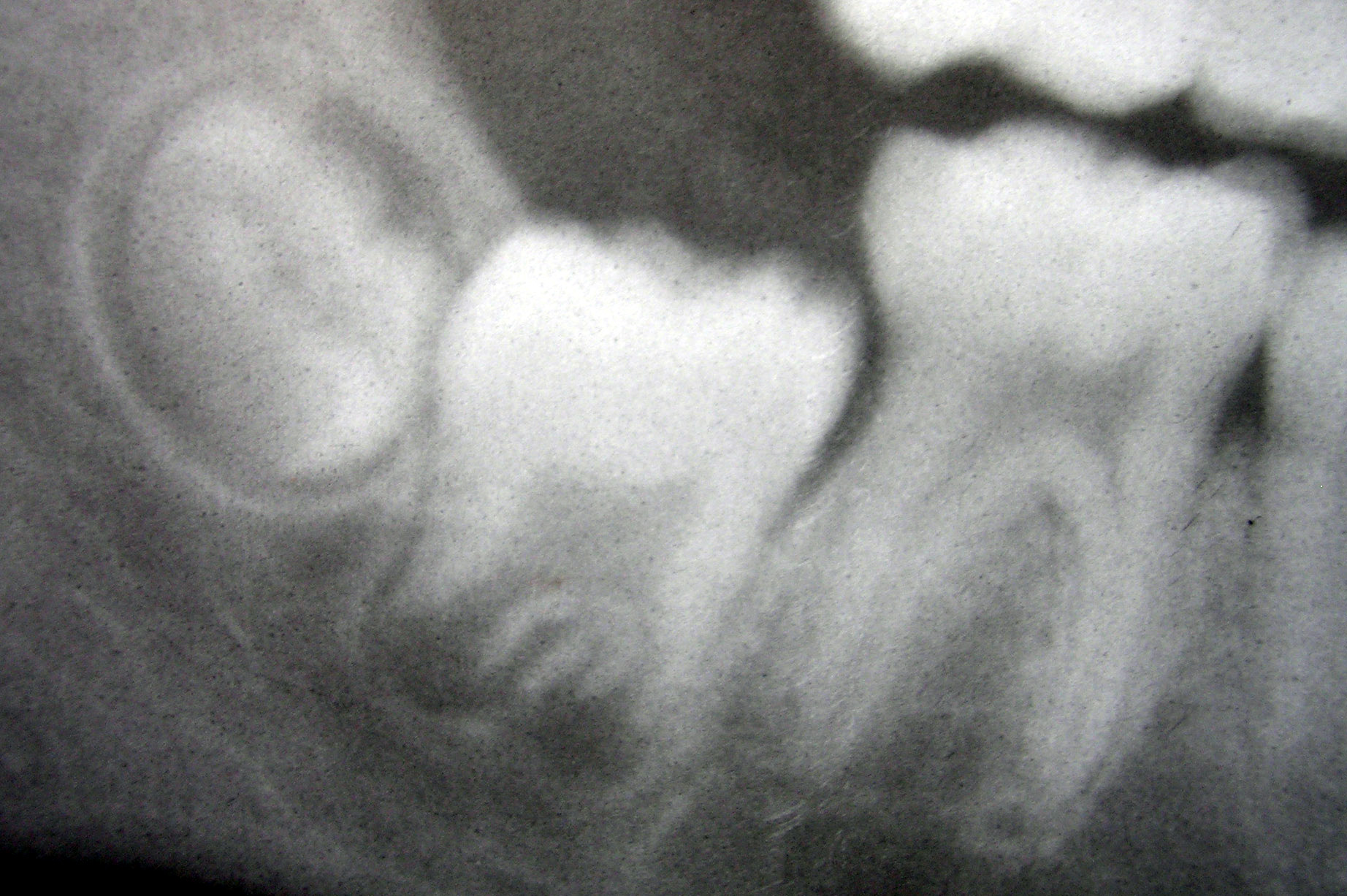
Radiograph of lower right (from left to right) third, second, and first molars in different stages of development

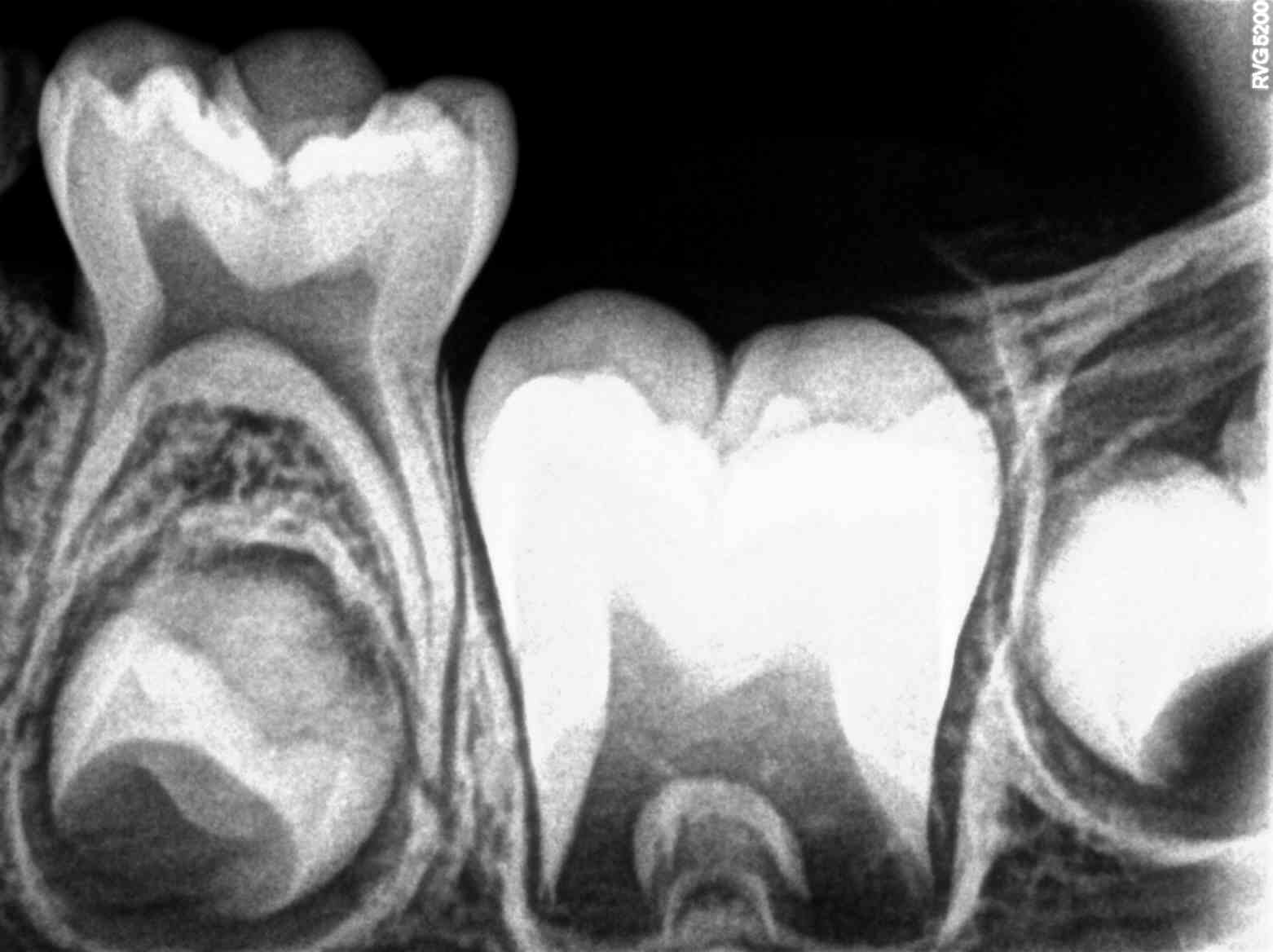
X-ray of teeth of a boy aged 5 years showing left lower primary molar and developing crowns of left lower permanent premolar (below primary molar) and permanent molars

Tooth development or odontogenesis is the complex process by which teeth form from embryonic cells, grow, and erupt into the mouth. For human teeth to have a healthy oral environment, all parts of the tooth must develop during appropriate stages of fetal development. Primary (baby) teeth start to form between the sixth and eighth week of prenatal development, and permanent teeth begin to form in the twentieth week. If teeth do not start to develop at or near these times, they will not develop at all, resulting in hypodontia or anodontia.

A significant amount of research has focused on determining the processes that initiate tooth development. It is widely accepted that there is a factor within the tissues of the first pharyngeal arch that is necessary for the development of teeth.

== Overview ==
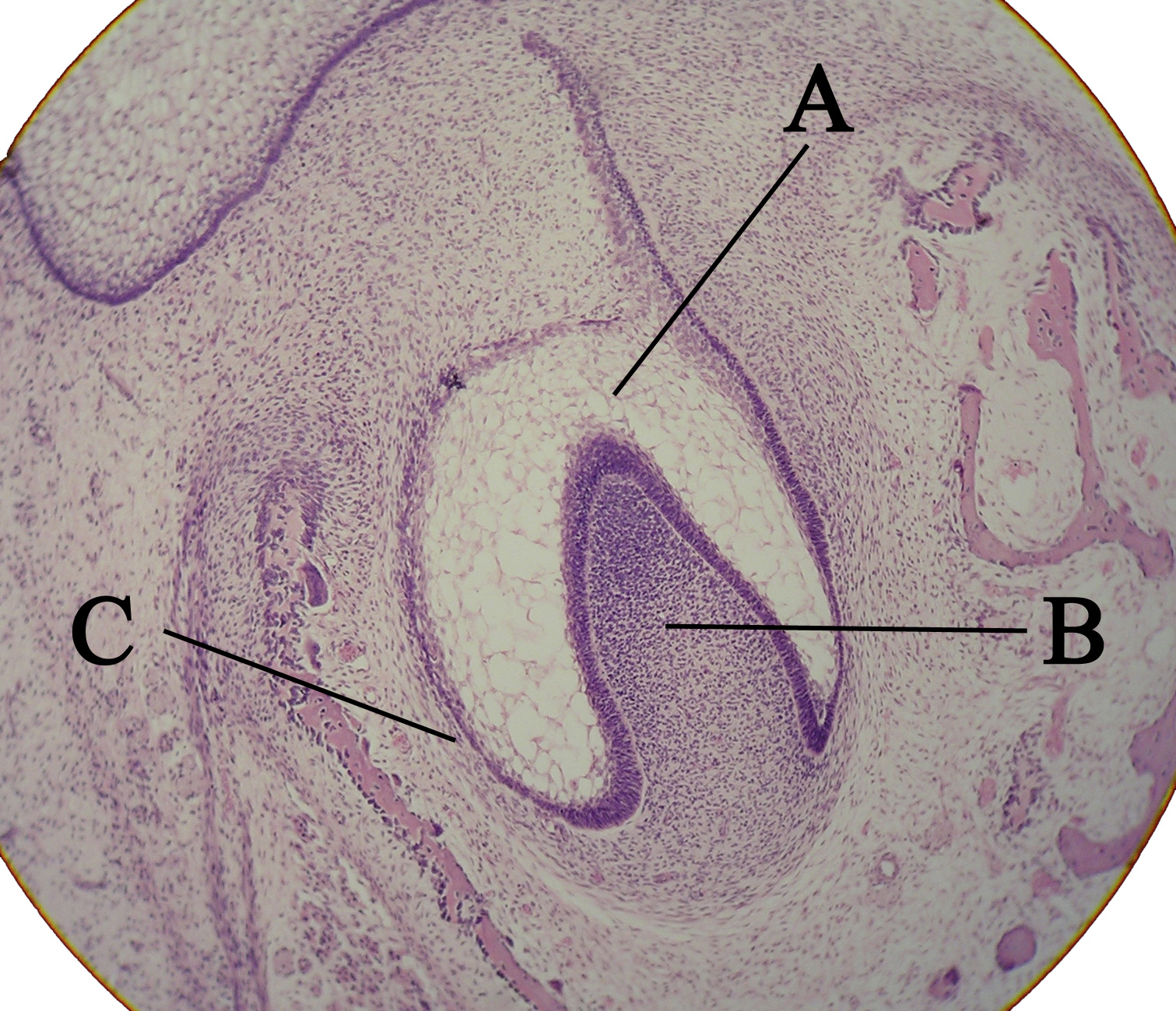
Histologic slide showing a tooth bud. A: enamel organ B: dental papilla C: dental follicle

The tooth germ is an aggregation of cells that eventually forms a tooth. These cells are derived from the ectoderm of the first pharyngeal arch and the ectomesenchyme of the neural crest. The tooth germ is organized into three parts: the enamel organ, the dental papilla and the dental sac or follicle.

The enamel organ is composed of the outer enamel epithelium, inner enamel epithelium, stellate reticulum and stratum intermedium. These cells give rise to ameloblasts, which produce enamel and become a part of the reduced enamel epithelium (REE) after maturation of the enamel. The location where the outer enamel epithelium and inner enamel epithelium join is called the cervical loop. The growth of cervical loop cells into the deeper tissues forms Hertwig Epithelial Root Sheath, which determines the root shape of the tooth. During tooth development there are strong similarities between keratinization and amelogenesis. Keratin is also present in epithelial cells of tooth germ and a thin film of keratin is present on a recently erupted tooth (Nasmyth's membrane or enamel cuticle).

The dental papilla contains cells that develop into odontoblasts, which are dentin-forming cells. Additionally, the junction between the dental papilla and inner enamel epithelium determines the crown shape of a tooth. Mesenchymal cells within the dental papilla are responsible for formation of tooth pulp.

The dental sac or follicle gives rise to three important entities: cementoblasts, osteoblasts, and fibroblasts. Cementoblasts form the cementum of a tooth. Osteoblasts give rise to the alveolar bone around the roots of teeth. Fibroblasts are involved developing the periodontal ligament which connect teeth to the alveolar bone through cementum.

NGF-R is present in the condensing ectomesenchymal cells of the dental papilla in the early cap stage tooth germ and plays multiple roles during morphogenetic and cytodifferentiation events in the tooth. There is a relationship between tooth agenesis and absence of the peripheral trigeminal nerve (see Hypodontia).

All stages (bud, cap, bell, crown), growth and morphogenesis of the teeth are regulated by a protein called sonic hedgehog.

Various phenotypic inputs modulate the size of the teeth.

Parathyroid hormone is required for tooth eruption.

=== Human tooth development timeline ===
The following tables present the development timeline of human teeth. Times for the initial calcification of primary teeth are for weeks in utero. Abbreviations: wk = weeks; mo = months; yr = years.

	Maxillary (upper) teeth				
Primary teeth	Central incisor	Lateral incisor	Canine	First molar	Second molar
Initial calcification	14 wk I.U.	16 wk I.U.	17 wk I.U.	15.5 wk I.U.	19 wk I.U.
Crown completed	1.5 mo	2.5 mo	9 mo	6 mo	11 mo
Root completed	1.5 yr	2 yr	3.25 yr	2.5 yr	3 yr
	Mandibular (lower) teeth				
Initial calcification	14 wk I.U.	16 wk I.U.	17 wk I.U.	15.5 wk I.U.	18 wk I.U.
Crown completed	2.5 mo	3 mo	9 mo	5.5 mo	10 mo
Root completed	1.5 yr	1.5 yr	3.25 yr	2.5 yr	3 yr

	Maxillary (upper) teeth							
Permanent teeth	Central incisor	Lateral incisor	Canine	First premolar	Second premolar	First molar	Second molar	Third molar
Initial calcification	3–4 mo	10–12 mo	4–5 mo	1.5–1.75 yr	2–2.25 yr	at birth	2.5–3 yr	7–9 yr
Crown completed	4–5 yr	4–5 yr	6–7 yr	5–6 yr	6–7 yr	2.5–3 yr	7–8 yr	12–16 yr
Root completed	10 yr	11 yr	13–15 yr	12–13 yr	12–14 yr	9–10 yr	14–16 yr	18–25 yr
	Mandibular (lower) teeth							
Initial calcification	3–4 mo	3–4 mo	4–5 mo	1.5–2 yr	2.25–2.5 yr	at birth	2.5–3 yr	8–10 yr
Crown completed	4–5 yr	4–5 yr	6–7 yr	5–6 yr	6–7 yr	2.5–3 yr	7–8 yr	12–16 yr
Root completed	9 yr	10 yr	12–14 yr	12–13 yr	13–14 yr	9–10 yr	14–15 yr	18–25 yr

== Stages ==
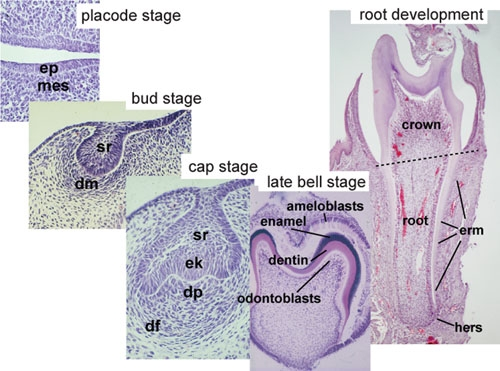
Histology of important stages of tooth development

Animation of major stages in early tooth development

Tooth development is commonly divided into the following stages: the initiation stage, the bud stage, the cap stage, the bell stage, and finally maturation. The staging of tooth development is an attempt to categorize changes that take place along a continuum; frequently it is difficult to decide what stage should be assigned to a particular developing tooth. This determination is further complicated by the varying appearance of different histologic sections of the same developing tooth, which can appear to be different stages.

=== Initiation stage ===
One of the earliest signs in the formation of a tooth that can be seen microscopically is the distinction between the vestibular lamina and the dental lamina. It occurs in the sixth to seventh week of the embryonic life. The dental lamina connects the developing tooth bud to the epithelial layer of the mouth for a significant time. This is regarded as the initiation stage.

=== Bud stage ===
The bud stage is characterized by the appearance of a tooth bud without a clear arrangement of cells. The stage technically begins once epithelial cells proliferate into the ectomesenchyme of the jaw. Typically, this occurs when the fetus is around 8 weeks old. The tooth bud itself is the group of cells at the periphery of the dental lamina.

Along with the formation of the dental lamina, 10 round epithelial structures, each referred to as a bud, develop at the distal aspect of the dental lamina of each arch. These correspond to the 10 primary teeth of each dental arch, and they signify the bud stage of tooth development. Each bud is separated from the ectomesenchyme by a basement membrane. Ectomesenchymal cells congregate deep to the bud, forming a cluster of cells, which is the initiation of the condensation of the ectomesenchyme. The remaining ectomesenchymal cells are arranged in a more or less haphazardly uniform fashion.

=== Cap stage ===
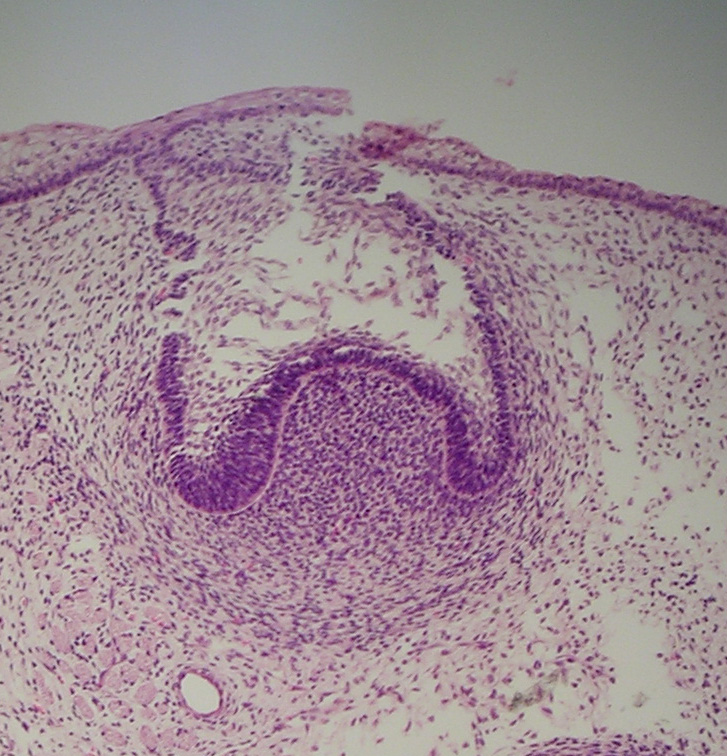
Histologic slide of tooth in cap stage

The first signs of an arrangement of cells in the tooth bud occur in the cap stage. A small group of ectomesenchymal cells stops producing extracellular substances, which results in an aggregation of these cells called the dental papilla. At this point, the tooth bud grows around the ectomesenchymal aggregation, taking on the appearance of a cap, and becomes the enamel (or dental) organ covering the dental papilla. A condensation of ectomesenchymal cells called the dental sac or follicle surrounds the enamel organ and limits the dental papilla. Eventually, the enamel organ will produce enamel, the dental papilla will produce dentin and pulp, and the dental sac will produce all the supporting structures of a tooth, the periodontium.

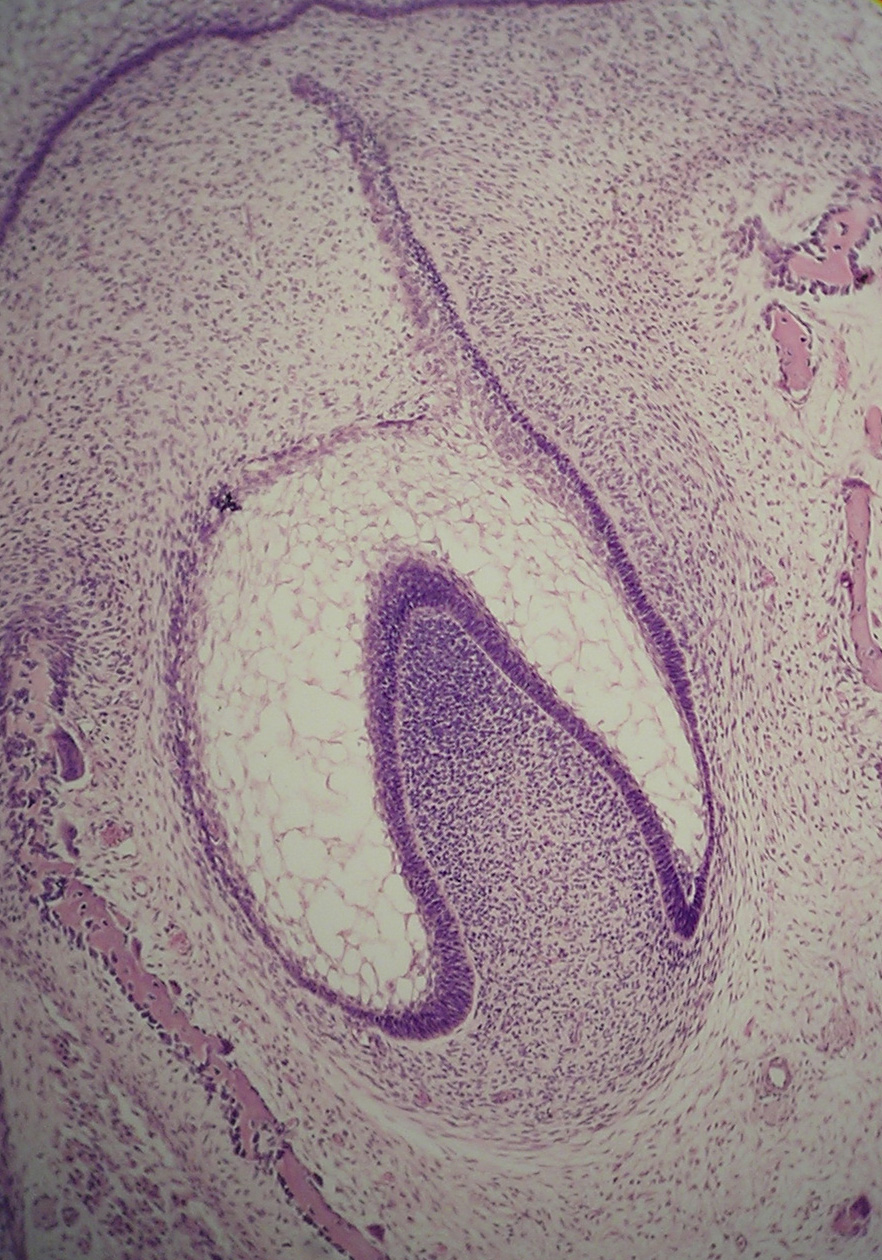
Histologic slide of tooth in early bell stage. Note cell organization.

=== Bell stage ===
The bell stage is known for the histodifferentiation and morphodifferentiation that takes place. The dental organ is bell-shaped during this stage, and the majority of its cells are called stellate reticulum because of their star-shaped appearance. The bell stage is divided into the early bell stage and the late bell stage. Cells on the periphery of the enamel organ separate into four important layers. Cuboidal cells on the periphery of the dental organ are known as outer enamel epithelium (OEE). The columnar cells of the enamel organ adjacent to the enamel papilla are known as inner enamel epithelium (IEE). The cells between the IEE and the stellate reticulum form a layer known as the stratum intermedium. The rim of the enamel organ where the outer and inner enamel epithelium join is called the cervical loop.

In summary, the layers in order of innermost to outermost consist of dentin, enamel (formed by IEE, or 'ameloblasts', as they move outwards/upwards), inner enamel epithelium and stratum intermedium (stratified cells that support the synthetic activity of the inner enamel epithelium) What follows is part of the initial 'enamel organ', the center of which is made up of stellate reticulum cells that serve to protect the enamel organ. This is all encased by the OEE layer.

Other events occur during the bell stage. The dental lamina disintegrates, leaving the developing teeth completely separated from the epithelium of the oral cavity; the two will not join again until the final eruption of the tooth into the mouth.

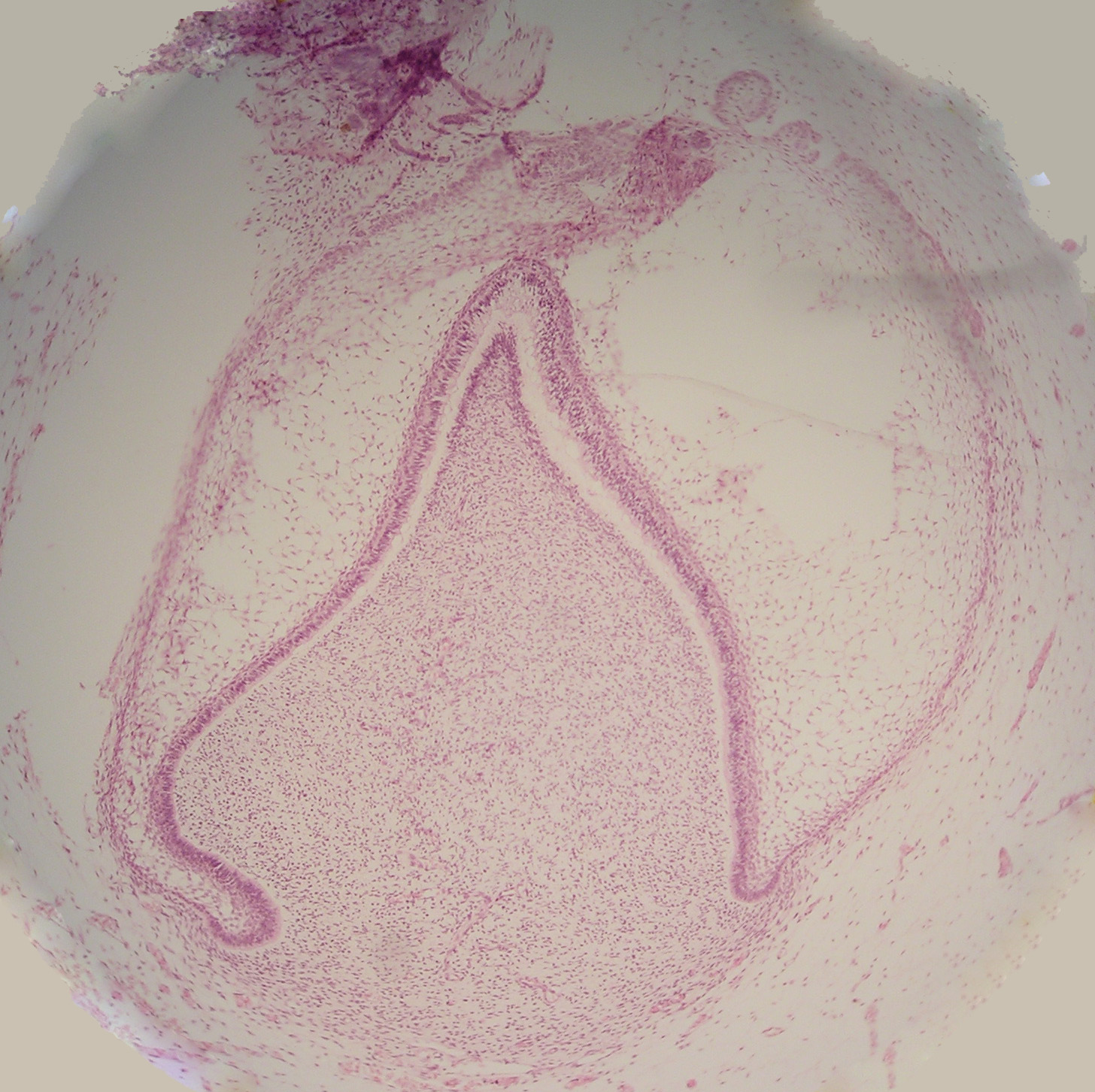
Histologic slide of tooth in late bell stage. Note disintegration of dental lamina at top.

The crown of the tooth, which is influenced by the shape of the inner enamel epithelium, also takes shape during this stage. Throughout the mouth, all teeth undergo this same process; it is still uncertain why teeth form various crown shapes—for instance, incisors versus canines. There are two dominant hypotheses. The "field model" proposes there are components for each type of tooth shape found in the ectomesenchyme during tooth development. The components for particular types of teeth, such as incisors, are localized in one area and dissipate rapidly in different parts of the mouth. Thus, for example, the "incisor field" has factors that develop teeth into incisor shape, and this field is concentrated in the central incisor area, but decreases rapidly in the canine area.

The other dominant hypothesis, the "clone model", proposes that the epithelium programs a group of ectomesenchymal cells to generate teeth of particular shapes. This group of cells, called a clone, coaxes the dental lamina into tooth development, causing a tooth bud to form. Growth of the dental lamina continues in an area called the "progress zone". Once the progress zone travels a certain distance from the first tooth bud, a second tooth bud will start to develop. These two models are not necessarily mutually exclusive, nor does widely accepted dental science consider them to be so: it is postulated that both models influence tooth development at different times.

Other structures that may appear in a developing tooth in this stage are enamel knots, enamel cords, and enamel niche.

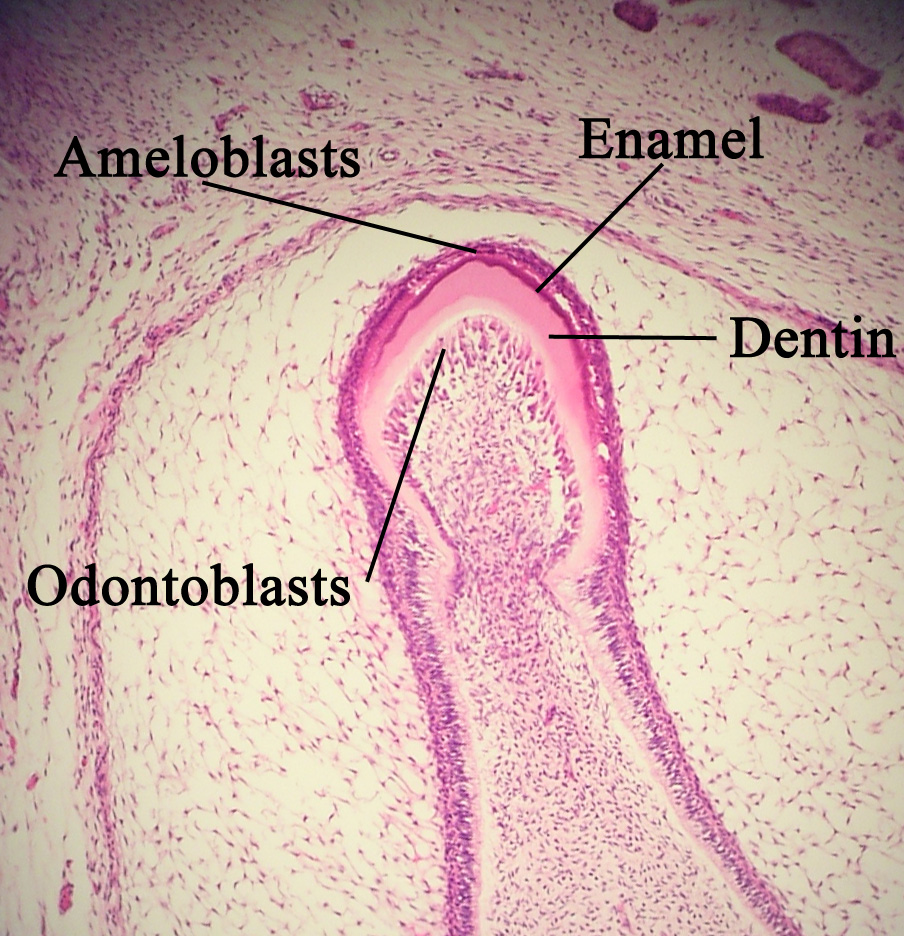
Histologic slide of developing hard tissues. Ameloblasts are forming enamel, while odontoblasts are forming dentin.

=== Advanced bell stage ===
Hard tissues, including enamel and dentin, develop during the next stage of tooth development. This stage is called the crown, or maturation stage, by some researchers. Important cellular changes occur at this time. In prior stages, all of the IEE cells were dividing to increase the overall size of the tooth bud, but rapid dividing, called mitosis, stops during the crown stage at the location where the cusps of the teeth form. The first mineralized hard tissues form at this location. At the same time, the IEE cells change in shape from cuboidal to columnar and become preameloblasts. The nuclei of these cells move closer to the stratum intermedium and away from the dental papilla as they become polarized.

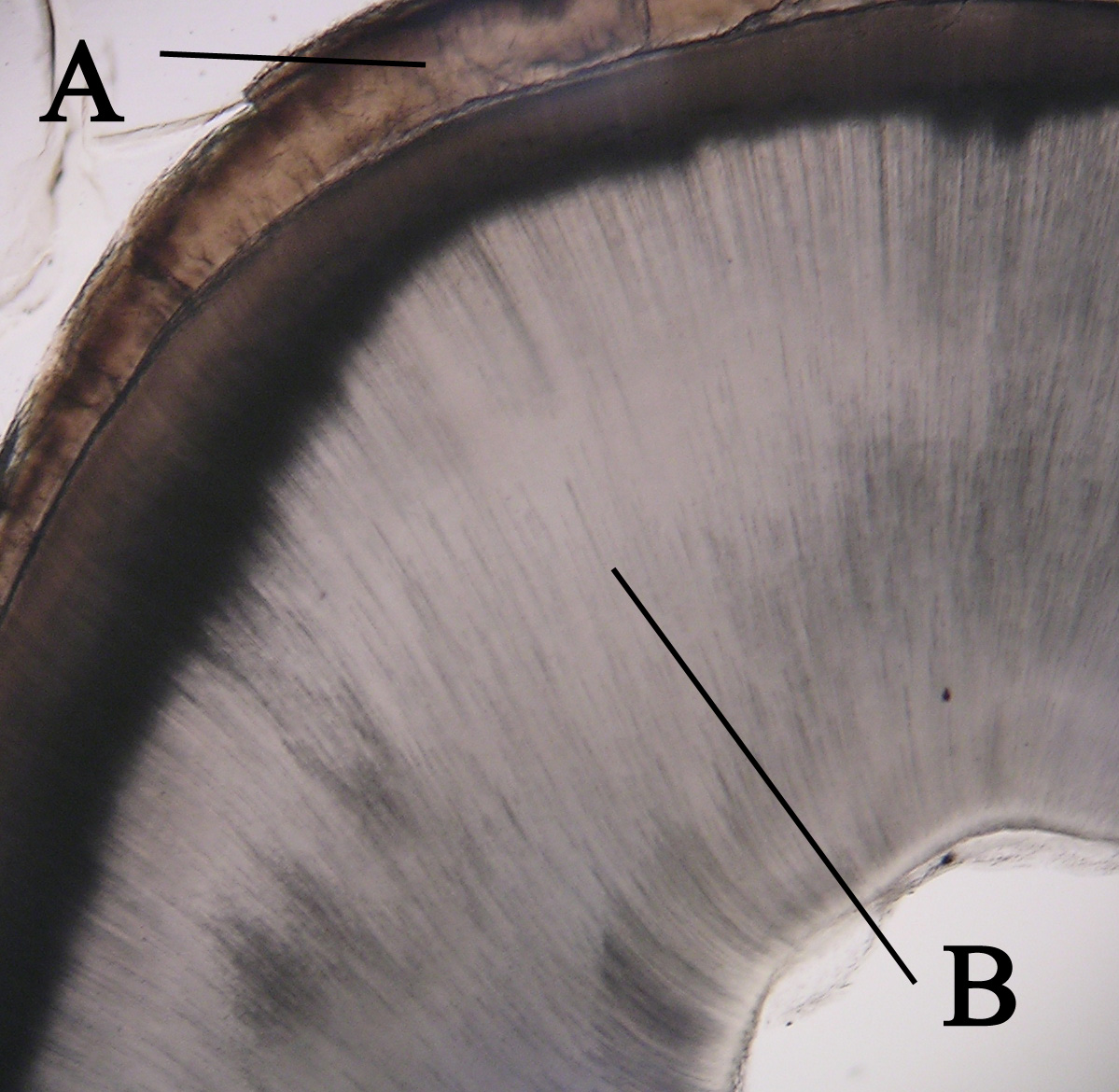
Histologic slide of tooth. Note the tubular appearance of dentin. A: enamel B: dentin

The adjacent layer of cells in the dental papilla suddenly increases in size and differentiates into odontoblasts, which are the cells that form dentin. Researchers believe that the odontoblasts would not form if it were not for the changes occurring in the IEE. As the changes to the IEE and the formation of odontoblasts continue from the tips of the cusps, the odontoblasts secrete a substance, an organic matrix, into their immediate surrounding. The organic matrix contains the material needed for dentin formation. As odontoblasts deposit organic matrix termed predentin, they migrate toward the center of the dental papilla. Thus, unlike enamel, dentin starts forming in the surface closest to the outside of the tooth and proceeds inward. Cytoplasmic extensions are left behind as the odontoblasts move inward. The unique, tubular microscopic appearance of dentin is a result of the formation of dentin around these extensions.

After dentin formation begins, the cells of the IEE secrete an organic matrix against the dentin. This matrix immediately mineralizes and becomes the initial layer of the tooth's enamel. Outside the dentin are the newly formed ameloblasts in response to the formation of dentin, which are cells that continue the process of enamel formation; therefore, enamel formation moves outwards, adding new material to the outer surface of the developing tooth.

== Hard tissue formation ==
Section of tooth undergoing development

=== Enamel ===
Enamel formation is called amelogenesis and occurs in the crown stage (advanced bell stage) of tooth development. "Reciprocal induction" governs the relationship between the formation of dentin and enamel; dentin formation must always occur before enamel formation. Generally, enamel formation occurs in two stages: the secretory and maturation stages. Proteins and an organic matrix form a partially mineralized enamel in the secretory stage; the maturation stage completes enamel mineralization.

In the secretory stage, ameloblasts release enamel proteins that contribute to the enamel matrix, which is then partially mineralized by the enzyme alkaline phosphatase. This mineralized phase occurs very early around the 3rd or 4th month of pregnancy. This marks the first appearance of enamel in the body. Ameloblasts make enamel at the location of where the cusps of the teeth are located. Enamel grows outwards, away from the center of the tooth.

In the maturation stage, the ameloblasts transport some of the substances used in enamel formation out of the enamel. Thus, the function of ameloblasts changes from enamel production, as occurs in the secretory stage, to transportation of substances. Most of the materials transported by ameloblasts in this stage are proteins used to complete mineralization. The important proteins involved are amelogenins, ameloblastins, enamelins, and tuftelins. By the end of this stage, the enamel has completed its mineralization.

A residue may form on newly erupted teeth of both dentitions that may leave the teeth extrinsically stained. This green-gray residue, Nasmyth membrane, consists of the fused tissue of the reduced enamel epithelium and oral epithelium, as well as the dental cuticle placed by the ameloblasts on the newly formed outer enamel surface. Nasmyth membrane then easily picks up stain from food debris and is hard to remove except by selective polishing. The child's supervising adults may need reassurance that it is only an extrinsic stain on a child's newly erupted teeth.

Patients with osteopetrosis display enamel abnormalities, suggesting that the a3 gene mutation found in V-ATPases also plays a role in the development of hypomineralized and hypoplastic enamel.

=== Dentin ===
Dentin formation, known as dentinogenesis, is the first identifiable feature in the crown stage of tooth development. The formation of dentin must always occur before the formation of enamel. The different stages of dentin formation result in different types of dentin: mantle dentin, primary dentin, secondary dentin, and tertiary dentin.

Odontoblasts, the dentin-forming cells, differentiate from cells of the dental papilla. They begin secreting an organic matrix around the area directly adjacent to the inner enamel epithelium, closest to the area of the future cusp of a tooth. The organic matrix contains collagen fibers with large diameters (0.1–0.2 μm in diameter). The odontoblasts begin to move toward the center of the tooth, forming an extension called the odontoblast process. Thus, dentin formation proceeds toward the inside of the tooth. The odontoblast process causes the secretion of hydroxyapatite crystals and mineralization of the matrix. This area of mineralization is known as mantle dentin and is a layer usually about 150 μm thick.

Whereas mantle dentin forms from the preexisting ground substance of the dental papilla, primary dentin forms through a different process. Odontoblasts increase in size, eliminating the availability of any extracellular resources to contribute to an organic matrix for mineralization. Additionally, the larger odontoblasts cause collagen to be secreted in smaller amounts, which results in more tightly arranged, heterogeneous nucleation that is used for mineralization. Other materials (such as lipids, phosphoproteins, and phospholipids) are also secreted.

Secondary dentin is formed after root formation is finished and occurs at a much slower rate. It is not formed at a uniform rate along the tooth, but instead forms faster along sections closer to the crown of a tooth. This development continues throughout life and accounts for the smaller areas of pulp found in older individuals. Tertiary dentin, also known as reparative dentin, forms in reaction to stimuli, such as attrition or dental caries.

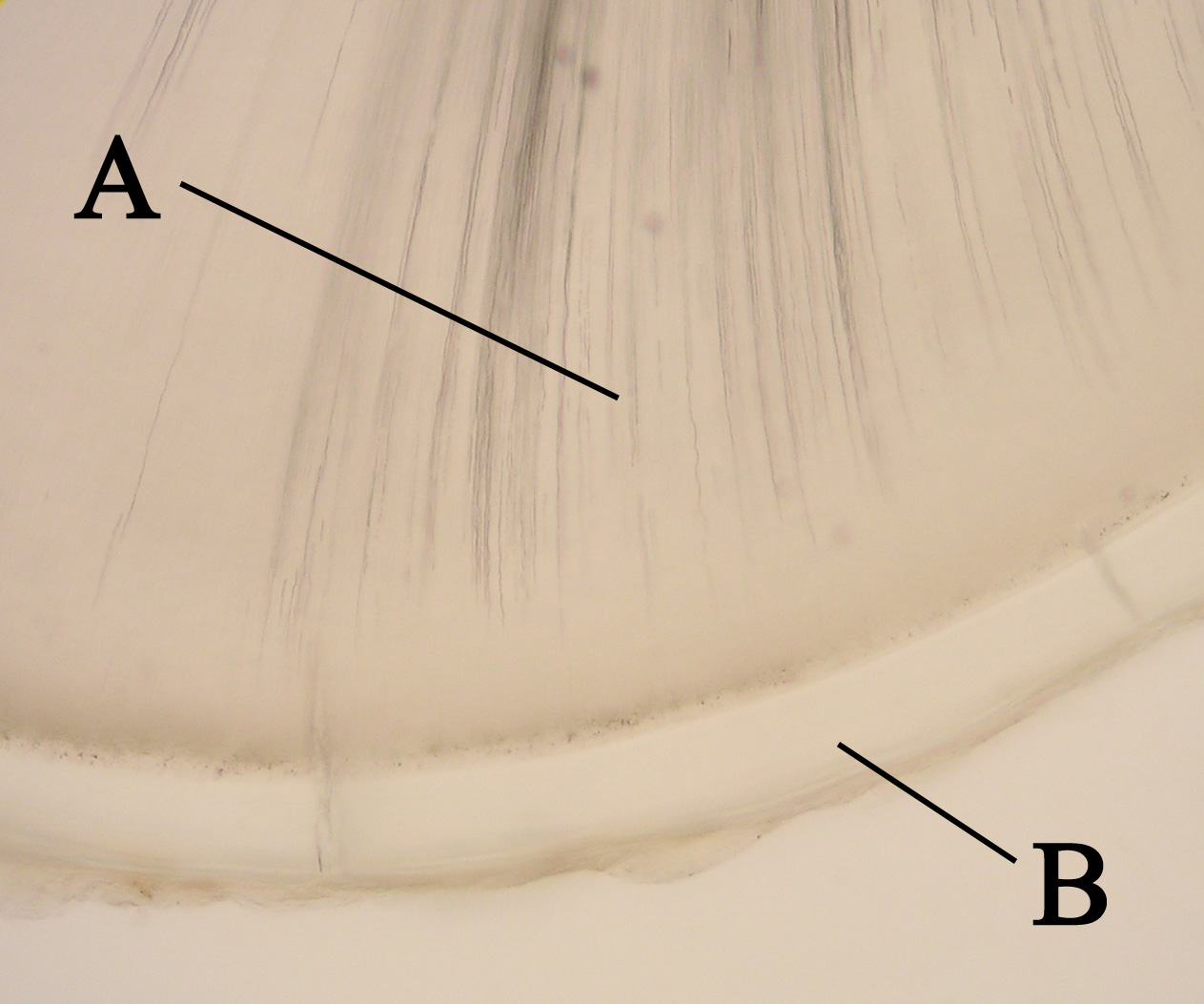
Cross-section of tooth at root. Note clear, acellular appearance of cementum. A: dentin B: cementum

=== Cementum ===
Cementum formation is called cementogenesis and occurs late in the development of teeth. Cementoblasts are the cells responsible for cementogenesis. Two types of cementum form: cellular and acellular.

Acellular cementum forms first. The cementoblasts differentiate from follicular cells, which can only reach the surface of the tooth's root once Hertwig's Epithelial Root Sheath (HERS) has begun to deteriorate. The cementoblasts secrete fine collagen fibrils along the root surface at right angles before migrating away from the tooth. As the cementoblasts move, more collagen is deposited to lengthen and thicken the bundles of fibers. Noncollagenous proteins, such as bone sialoprotein and osteocalcin, are also secreted. Acellular cementum contains a secreted matrix of proteins and fibers. As mineralization takes place, the cementoblasts move away from the cementum, and the fibers left along the surface eventually join the forming periodontal ligaments.

Cellular cementum develops after most of the tooth formation is complete and after the tooth occludes (in contact) with a tooth in the opposite arch. This type of cementum forms around the fiber bundles of the periodontal ligaments. The cementoblasts forming cellular cementum become trapped in the cementum they produce.

The origin of the formative cementoblasts is believed to be different for cellular cementum and acellular cementum. One of the major current hypotheses is that cells producing cellular cementum migrate from the adjacent area of bone, while cells producing acellular cementum arise from the dental follicle. Nonetheless, it is known that cellular cementum is usually not found in teeth with one root. In premolars and molars, cellular cementum is found only in the part of the root closest to the apex and in interradicular areas between multiple roots.

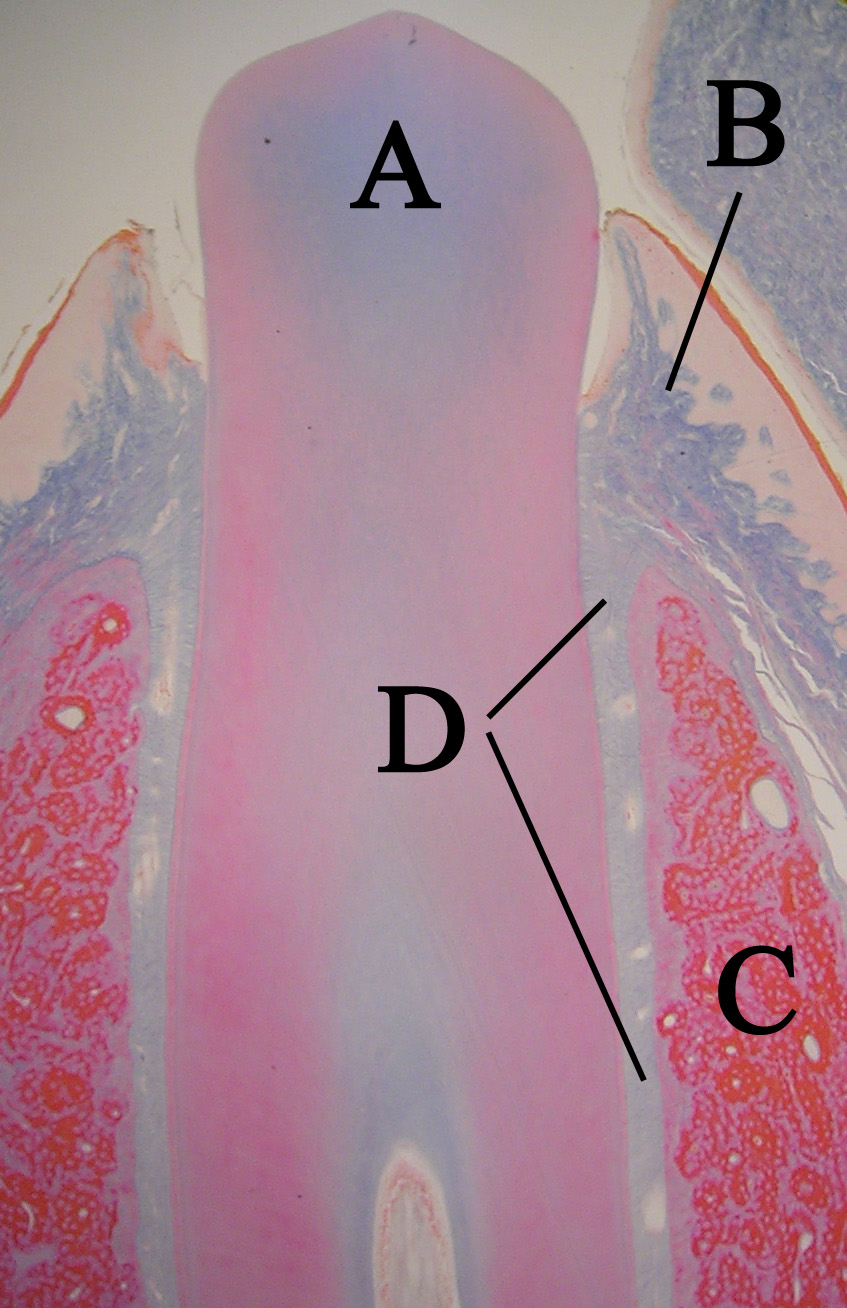
Histologic slide of tooth erupting into the mouth. A: tooth B: gingiva C: bone D: periodontal ligaments

== Formation of the periodontium ==
The periodontium, which is the supporting structure of a tooth, consists of the cementum, periodontal ligaments, gingiva, and alveolar bone. Cementum is the only one of these that is a part of a tooth. Alveolar bone surrounds the roots of teeth to provide support and creates what is commonly called a "socket". Periodontal ligaments connect the alveolar bone to the cementum, and the gingiva is the surrounding tissue visible in the mouth.

=== Periodontal ligament ===
Cells from the dental follicle give rise to the periodontal ligament (PDL). Specific events leading to the formation of the periodontal ligament vary between deciduous (baby) and permanent teeth and among various species of animals. Nonetheless, formation of the periodontal ligament begins with ligament fibroblasts from the dental follicle. These fibroblasts secrete collagen, which interacts with fibers on the surfaces of adjacent bone and cementum.

This interaction leads to an attachment that develops as the tooth erupts into the mouth. The occlusion, which is the arrangement of teeth and how teeth in opposite arches come in contact with one another, continually affects the formation of periodontal ligament. This perpetual creation of periodontal ligament leads to the formation of groups of fibers in different orientations, such as horizontal and oblique fibers.

=== Alveolar bone ===
As root and cementum formation begin, bone is created in the adjacent area. Throughout the body, cells that form bone are called osteoblasts. In the case of alveolar bone, these osteoblast cells form from the dental follicle. Similar to the formation of primary cementum, collagen fibers are created on the surface nearest the tooth, and they remain there until attaching to periodontal ligaments.

Like any other bone in the human body, alveolar bone is modified throughout life. Osteoblasts create bone and osteoclasts destroy it, especially if force is placed on a tooth. As is the case when movement of teeth is attempted through orthodontics using bands, wires, or appliances, an area of bone under compressive force from a tooth moving toward it has a high osteoclast level, resulting in bone resorption. An area of bone receiving tension from periodontal ligaments attached to a tooth moving away from it has a high number of osteoblasts, resulting in bone formation. Thus, the tooth or teeth are slowly moved along the jaw so as to achieve a dentition that works in harmony. In this way, the width of the space between the alveoli and the root is kept about the same.

=== Gingiva ===
The connection between the gingiva and the tooth is called the dentogingival junction. This junction has three epithelial types: gingival, sulcular, and junctional epithelium. These three types form from a mass of epithelial cells known as the epithelial cuff between the tooth and the mouth.

Much about gingival formation is not fully understood, but it is known that hemidesmosomes form between the gingival epithelium and the tooth and are responsible for the primary epithelial attachment. Hemidesmosomes provide anchorage between cells through small filament-like structures provided by the remnants of ameloblasts. Once this occurs, junctional epithelium forms from reduced enamel epithelium, one of the products of the enamel organ, and divides rapidly. This results in the perpetually increasing size of the junctional epithelial layer and the isolation of the remnants of ameloblasts from any source of nutrition. As the ameloblasts degenerate, a gingival sulcus is created.

== Nerve and vascular formation ==
Frequently, nerves and blood vessels run parallel to each other in the body, and the formation of both usually takes place simultaneously and in a similar fashion. However, this is not the case for nerves and blood vessels around the tooth, because of different rates of development.

=== Nerve formation ===
Nerve fibers start to near the tooth during the cap stage of tooth development and grow toward the dental follicle. Once there, the nerves develop around the tooth bud and enter the dental papilla when dentin formation has begun. Nerves never proliferate into the enamel organ.

=== Vascular formation ===
Blood vessels grow in the dental follicle and enter the dental papilla in the cap stage. Groups of blood vessels form at the entrance of the dental papilla. The number of blood vessels reaches a maximum at the beginning of the crown stage, and the dental papilla eventually forms in the pulp of a tooth. Throughout life, the amount of pulpal tissue in a tooth decreases, which means that the blood supply to the tooth decreases with age. The enamel organ is devoid of blood vessels because of its epithelial origin, and the mineralized tissues of enamel and dentin do not need nutrients from the blood.

== Tooth eruption ==
Tooth eruption occurs when the teeth enter the mouth and become visible. Although researchers agree that tooth eruption is a complex process, there is little agreement on the identity of the mechanism that controls eruption. Some commonly held theories that have been disproven over time include: (1) the tooth is pushed upward into the mouth by the growth of the tooth's root, (2) the tooth is pushed upward by the growth of the bone around the tooth, (3) the tooth is pushed upward by vascular pressure, and (4) the tooth is pushed upward by the cushioned hammock. The cushioned hammock theory, first proposed by Harry Sicher, was taught widely from the 1930s to the 1950s. This theory postulated that a ligament below a tooth, which Sicher observed under a microscope on a histologic slide, was responsible for eruption. Later, the "ligament" Sicher observed was determined to be merely an artifact created in the process of preparing the slide.

The most widely held current theory is that while several forces might be involved in eruption, the periodontal ligaments provide the main impetus for the process. Theorists hypothesize that the periodontal ligaments promote eruption through the shrinking and cross-linking of their collagen fibers and the contraction of their fibroblasts.

Although tooth eruption occurs at different times for different people, a general eruption timeline exists. Typically, humans have 20 primary (baby) teeth and 32 permanent teeth. Tooth eruption has three stages. The first, known as deciduous dentition stage, occurs when only primary teeth are visible. Once the first permanent tooth erupts into the mouth, the teeth are in the mixed (or transitional) dentition. After the last primary tooth falls out of the mouth—a process known as exfoliation—the teeth are in the permanent dentition.

Primary dentition starts on the arrival of the mandibular central incisors, usually at eight months, and lasts until the first permanent molars appear in the mouth, usually at six years. The primary teeth typically erupt in the following order: (1) central incisor, (2) lateral incisor, (3) first molar, (4) canine, and (5) second molar. As a general rule, four teeth erupt for every six months of life, mandibular teeth erupt before maxillary teeth, and teeth erupt sooner in females than males. During primary dentition, the tooth buds of permanent teeth develop below the primary teeth, close to the palate or tongue.

Mixed dentition starts when the first permanent molar appears in the mouth, usually at six years, and lasts until the last primary tooth is lost, usually at eleven or twelve years. Permanent teeth in the maxilla erupt in a different order from permanent teeth on the mandible. Maxillary teeth erupt in the following order: (1) first molar (2) central incisor, (3) lateral incisor, (4) first premolar, (5) second premolar, (6) canine, (7) second molar, and (8) third molar. Mandibular teeth erupt in the following order: (1) first molar (2) central incisor, (3) lateral incisor, (4) canine, (5) first premolar, (6) second premolar, (7) second molar, and (8) third molar. Since there are no premolars in the primary dentition, the primary molars are replaced by permanent premolars. If any primary teeth are lost before permanent teeth are ready to replace them, some posterior teeth may drift forward and cause space to be lost in the mouth. This may cause crowding and/or misplacement once the permanent teeth erupt, which is usually referred to as malocclusion. Orthodontics may be required in such circumstances for an individual to achieve a straight set of teeth.

The permanent dentition begins when the last primary tooth is lost, usually at 11 to 12 years, and lasts for the rest of a person's life or until all of the teeth are lost (edentulism). During this stage, third molars (also called "wisdom teeth") are frequently extracted because of decay, pain or impactions. The main reasons for tooth loss are decay and periodontal disease.

Eruption times for primary and permanent teeth
	Primary teeth							
Teeth	Central incisor	Lateral incisor	Canine	First premolar	Second premolar	First molar	Second molar	Third molar
Maxillary teeth	10 mo	11 mo	19 mo	-	-	-16 mo	-29 mo	-
Mandibular teeth	8 mo	13 mo	20 mo	-	-	-16 mo	-27 mo	-
	Permanent teeth							
Teeth	Central incisor	Lateral incisor	Canine	First premolar	Second premolar	First molar	Second molar	Third molar
Maxillary teeth	7–8 yr	8–9 yr	11–12 yr	10–11 yr	10–12 yr	6–7 yr	12–13 yr	17–21 yr
Mandibular teeth	6–7 yr	7–8 yr	9–10 yr	10–12 yr	11–12 yr	6–7 yr	11–13 yr	17–21 yr

Immediately after the eruption enamel is covered by a specific film: Nasmyth's membrane or 'enamel cuticle', structure of embryological origin is composed of keratin which gives rise to the enamel organ.

== Nutrition and tooth development ==
As in other aspects of human growth and development, nutrition has an effect on the developing tooth. Essential nutrients for a healthy tooth include calcium, phosphorus, and vitamins A, C, and D. Calcium and phosphorus are needed to properly form the hydroxyapatite crystals, and their levels in the blood are maintained by Vitamin D. Vitamin A is necessary for the formation of keratin, as Vitamin C is for collagen. Fluoride, although not a nutrient, is incorporated into the hydroxyapatite crystal of a developing tooth and bones. The dental theory is the low levels of fluoride incorporation and very mild fluorosis makes the tooth more resistant to demineralization and subsequent decay.

Deficiencies of nutrients can have a wide range of effects on tooth development. In situations where calcium, phosphorus, and vitamin D are deficient, the hard structures of a tooth may be less mineralized. A lack of vitamin A can cause a reduction in the amount of enamel formation.

Fluoride ingestion has been noted to delay eruption of teeth for as much as a year or more from the accepted eruption dates since the initial 1940s fluoridation trials. Researchers theorize that the delay is a manifestation of fluoride's depressing impact on thyroid hormones. The delay in eruption has been suggested as the reason for the apparent difference in decay among the youngest children. Fluoride ingestion during tooth development can lead to a permanent condition known as fluorosis with varying levels of severity, the result of fluoride's interference with the normal osteoblast development.

Undiagnosed and untreated celiac disease often causes dental enamel defects and can be the only manifestation of the disease, in absence of gastrointestinal symptoms or malabsorption signs.

Bisphenol A (BPA) is a hormone-disrupting chemical that has been implicated in having negative effects on human health, including, but not limited to, fetal development. As shown in animal studies which mimic human enamel, the mother's consumption of products with BPA during pregnancy can lead to the child's tooth development being obstructed. Those children are shown to be prone to incisor and first molar hypomineralization, a weakened state of the enamel. Additionally, it is most important for mother's to avoid BPA during pregnancy, but also avoid BPA-use in the child's products up to five months of age.

== Developmental disturbances ==
The absence of third molars is very common, occurring in 20–23% of the population, followed in prevalence by the second premolar and lateral incisor.

Anodontia is a complete lack of tooth development. It is rare, most often occurring in a condition called hypohidrotic ectodermal dysplasia.

Hypodontia is a lack of some tooth development (not including third molars). It is one of the most common developmental abnormalities, affecting 3.5–8.0% of the population. Hypodontia is often associated with the absence of a dental lamina, which is vulnerable to environmental forces like infection and chemotherapy medications. It is also associated with many syndromes, such as Down syndrome and Crouzon syndrome.

Hyperdontia is the development of extraneous teeth. It occurs in 1–3% of Caucasians and is more frequent in Asians. About 86% of these cases involve a single extra tooth in the mouth, most commonly found in the maxilla, where the incisors are located. Hyperdontia is believed to be associated with an excess of dental lamina.

Dilaceration is an abnormal bend found on a tooth, and is nearly always associated with trauma that moves the developing tooth bud. As a tooth is forming, a force can move the tooth from its original position, leaving the rest of the tooth to form at an abnormal angle. Cysts or tumors adjacent to a tooth bud are forces known to cause dilaceration, as are primary (baby) teeth pushed upward by trauma into the gingiva where it moves the tooth bud of the permanent tooth.

Enamel hypoplasia or hypomineralization is a defect of the teeth caused by a disturbance in the formation of the organic enamel matrix, clinically visible as enamel defects. It may be caused by nutritional factors, some diseases (such as undiagnosed and untreated celiac disease, chicken pox, congenital syphilis), hypocalcemia, fluoride ingestion, birth injury, preterm birth, infection or trauma from a deciduous tooth. In some circumstances enamel hypoplasia can be so severe that last sections of enamel is missing, exposing the underlying dentin.

Some systemic conditions may cause delayed tooth development, such as nutritional factors, endocrine disorders (hypothyroidism, hypopituitarism, hypoparathyroidism, pseudohypoparathyroidism), undiagnosed and untreated celiac disease, anemia, prematurity, low birth weight, renal failure, heavy metal intoxication or tobacco smoke, among others.

Regional odontodysplasia is rare, but is most likely to occur in the maxilla and anterior teeth. The cause is unknown; a number of causes have been postulated, including a disturbance in the neural crest cells, infection, radiation therapy, and a decrease in vascular supply (the most widely held hypothesis). Teeth affected by regional odontodysplasia nevAmelogenesis imperfecta is an autosomal dominant disease characterized by a defect in dental enamel formation. Teeth are often free of enamel, small, misshapen, and tinted brown. The cause of these deformities is due to a mutation in enamel in expression. Dental patients with this disease should be especially cautious and visit their dentist frequently.

Natal and neonatal teeth are an anomaly that involves teeth erupting in a newborn infant's mouth earlier than usual. The incidence ranges from 1:2,000 to 1:3,500 births. Natal teeth are more frequent, approximately three times more common than neonatal teeth. Some authors reported a higher prevalence in females than males. The most common location is the mandibular region of the central incisors. Natal teeth and neonatal teeth are associated with genetics, developmental abnormalities and certain recognized syndromes. Additional names for this condition include precocious dentition, baby teeth, and milk teeth.

== See also ==
- Polyphyodont
- Tooth regeneration
- Animal tooth development

== Additional references ==
- The American Academy of Periodontology. "Oral Health Information for the Public". Retrieved April 10, 2014.
- The American Dental Association. . Retrieved April 10, 2014.
- The American Dental Hygiene Association. "Nutritional Factors in Tooth Development" Archived 2013-01-06 at the Wayback Machine. Retrieved December 10, 2005.
- The American Dental Hygiene Association. "Table II. Effects of nutrient deficiencies on tooth development" Archived 2013-01-06 at the Wayback Machine. Retrieved December 10, 2005.
- Ash, Major M. and Stanley J. Nelson. Wheeler's Dental Anatomy, Physiology, and Occlusion. 8th edition. 2003. ISBN 0-7216-9382-2.
- Buchheim, Jason. "A Quick Course in Ichthyology". Page accessed January 7, 2006.
- Cate, A.R. Ten. Oral Histology: development, structure, and function. 5th ed. 1998. ISBN 0-8151-2952-1.
- Caceci, Thomas. Veterinary Histology with subtitle "Digestive System: Oral Cavity". Retrieved December 15, 2005.
- Frandson, R.D. & T.L. Spurgeon, 1992. Anatomy and Physiology of Farm Animals. 5th edition. Philadelphia, Lea & Febiger. ISBN 0-8121-1435-3.
- Harris, Edward F. Craniofacial Growth and Development. In the section entitled "Tooth Eruption." 2002.
- Health Hawaii. . Retrieved December 12, 2005.
- Johnson, Clarke. "Biology of the Human Dentition". 1998.
- Kahn, Michael A. Basic Oral and Maxillofacial Pathology. Volume 1. 2001.
- Monthly Microscopy Explorations "Exploration of the Month: January 1998".
- Neville, B.W., Douglas Damm, Carl Allen, Jerry Bouquot. Oral & Maxillofacial Pathology. 2nd edition. 2002. ISBN 0-7216-9003-3.
- Riolo, Michael L. and James K. Avery. Essentials for Orthodontic Practice. 1st edition. 2003. ISBN 0-9720546-0-X.
- Ross, Michael H., Gordon I. Kaye, and Wojciech Pawlina. Histology: a text and atlas. 4th edition. 2003. ISBN 0-683-30242-6.
- Summitt, James B., J. William Robbins, and Richard S. Schwartz. Fundamentals of Operative Dentistry: A Contemporary Approach. 2nd edition. Carol Stream, Illinois, Quintessence Publishing Co, Inc. 2001. ISBN 0-86715-382-2.
- University of Southern California School of Dentistry. "The Bell Stage: Image 26". Retrieved December 11, 2005.
- . . Retrieved December 11, 2005.
- University of Texas Medical Branch. "Lab Exercises: Tooth development"
- Williams, Michael E. "Jaws: The early years" Archived 2016-03-24 at the Wayback Machine. 1992. Page accessed January 7, 2006.
- WebMd. "Dental Health: Your Child's Teeth". Retrieved December 12, 2005.
- <Please add first missing authors to populate metadata.> (1995). "Odontogenesis". The International Journal of Developmental Biology. 39, N° 1. Archived from the original on 2011-07-16.
