= Dental anatomy =

Field of anatomy dedicated to human teeth

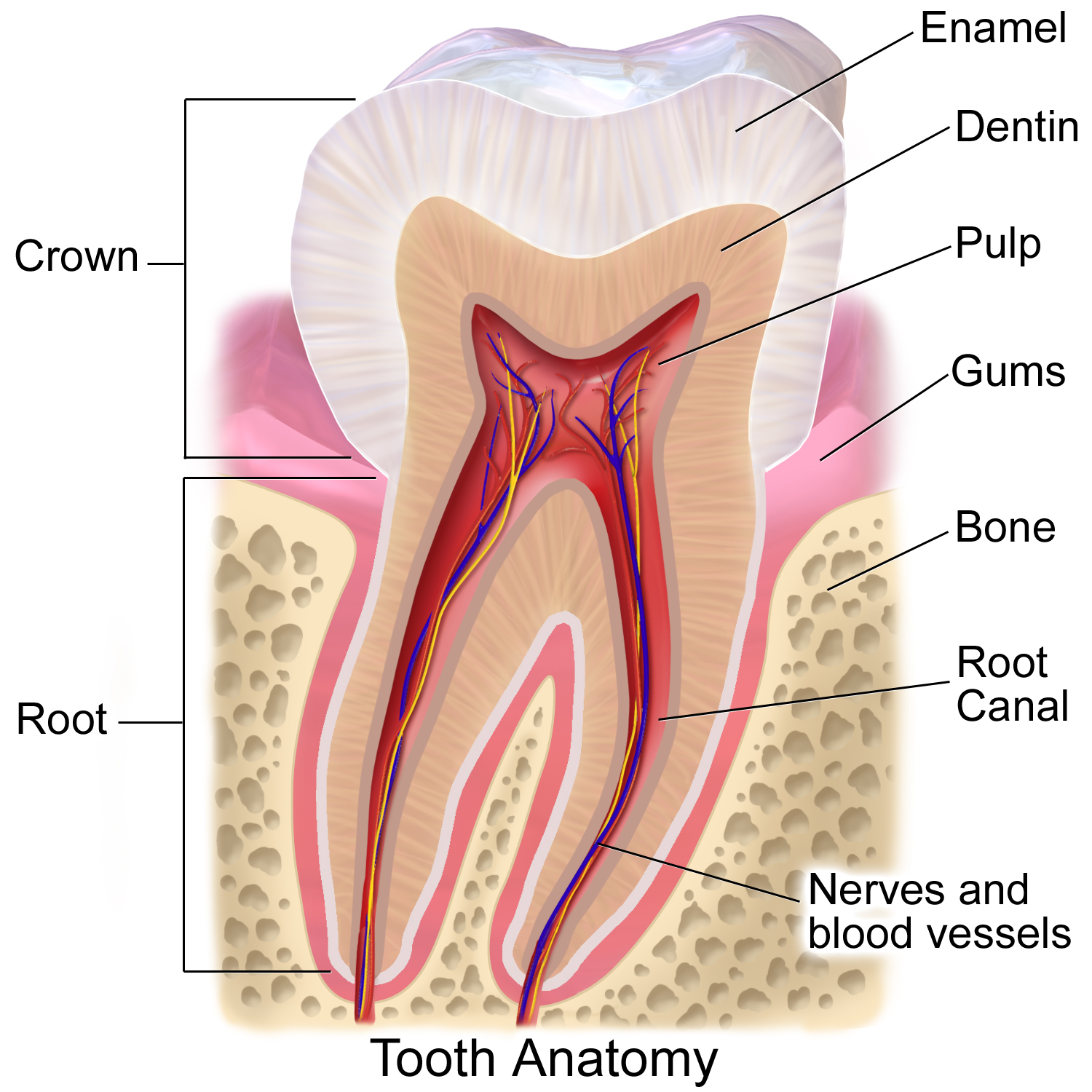
Diagram of tooth anatomy

Dental anatomy is a field of anatomy dedicated to the study of human tooth structures. The development, appearance, and classification of teeth fall within its purview. (The function of teeth as they contact one another falls elsewhere, under dental occlusion.) Tooth formation begins before birth, and the teeth's eventual morphology is dictated during this time. Dental anatomy is also a taxonomical science: it is concerned with the naming of teeth and the structures of which they are made, this information serving a practical purpose in dental treatment.

Usually, there are 20 primary ("baby") teeth and 32 permanent teeth, the last four being third molars or "wisdom teeth", each of which may or may not grow in. Among primary teeth, 10 usually are found in the maxilla (upper jaw) and the other 10 in the mandible (lower jaw). Among permanent teeth, 16 are found in the maxilla and the other 16 in the mandible. Each tooth has specific distinguishing features.

== Growing of tooth ==
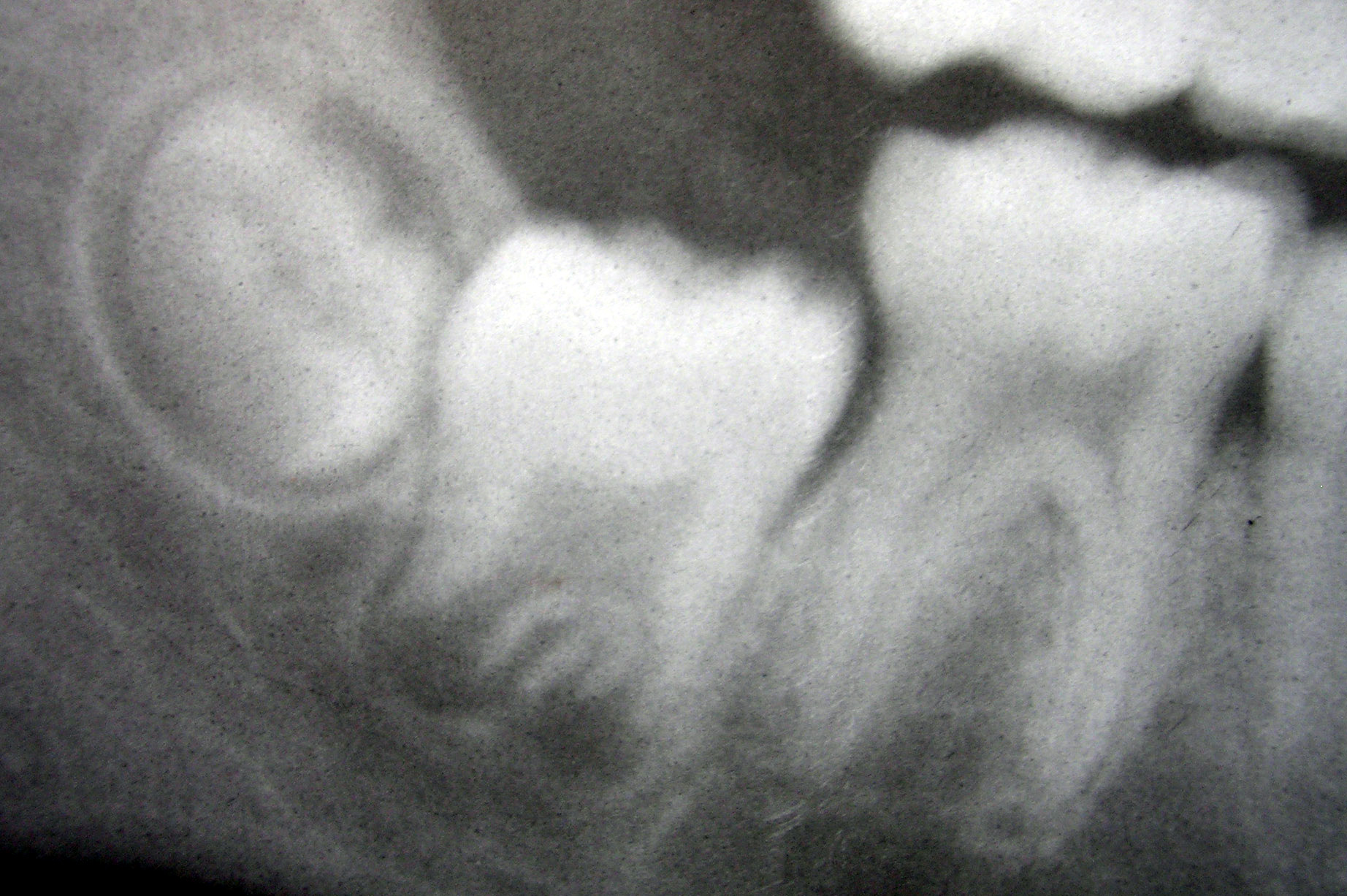
Radiograph of lower right (from left to right) third, second, and first molars in different stages of development

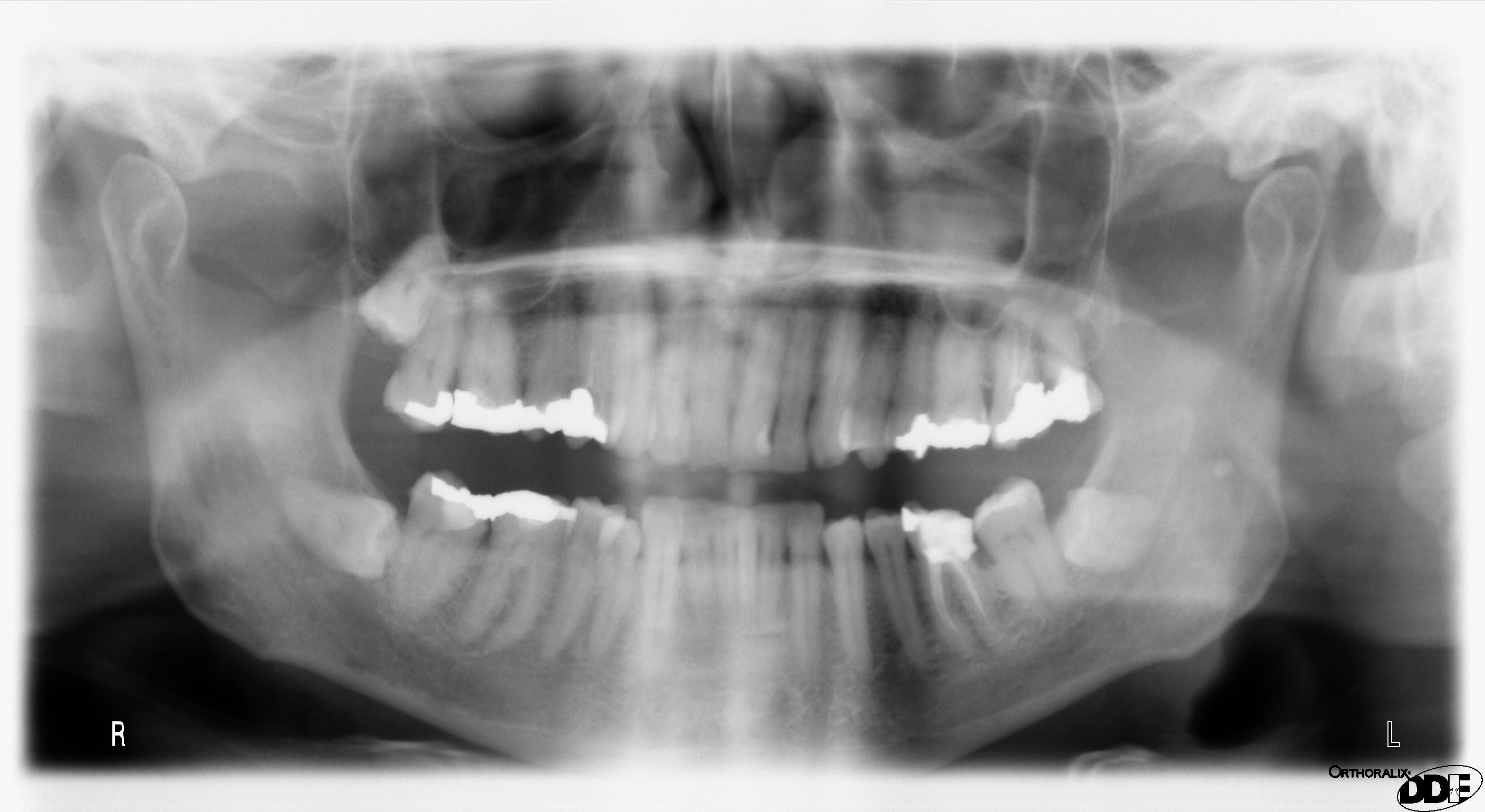
Panoramic x-ray radiography of the teeth of a 64-year-old male. Dental work performed mostly in UK/Europe in last half of 20th Century

Tooth development is the complex process by which teeth form from embryonic cells, grow, and erupt into the mouth. Although many diverse species have teeth, non-human tooth development is largely the same as in humans. For human teeth to have a healthy oral environment, enamel, dentin, cementum, and the periodontium must all develop during appropriate stages of fetal development. Primary (baby) teeth start to form between the sixth and eighth weeks in utero, and permanent teeth begin to form in the twentieth week in utero. If teeth do not start to develop at or near these times, they will not develop at all.

A significant amount of research has focused on determining the processes that initiate tooth development. It is widely accepted that there is a factor within the tissues of the first branchial arch that is necessary for the development of teeth. The tooth bud (sometimes called the tooth germ) is an aggregation of cells that eventually forms a tooth and is organized into three parts: the enamel organ, the dental papilla and the dental follicle.

The enamel organ is composed of the outer enamel epithelium, inner enamel epithelium, stellate reticulum and stratum intermedium. These cells give rise to ameloblasts, which produce enamel and the reduced enamel epithelium. The growth of cervical loop cells into the deeper tissues forms Hertwig's Epithelial Root Sheath, which determines the root shape of the tooth. The dental papilla contains cells that develop into odontoblasts, which are dentin-forming cells. Additionally, the junction between the dental papilla and inner enamel epithelium determines the crown shape of a tooth. The dental follicle gives rise to three important entities: cementoblasts, osteoblasts, and fibroblasts. Cementoblasts form the cementum of a tooth. Osteoblasts give rise to the alveolar bone around the roots of teeth. Fibroblasts develop the periodontal ligaments which connect teeth to the alveolar bone through cementum.

Tooth development is commonly divided into the following stages: the bud stage, the cap, the bell, and finally maturation. The staging of tooth development is an attempt to categorize changes that take place along a continuum; frequently it is difficult to decide what stage should be assigned to a particular developing tooth. This determination is further complicated by the varying appearance of different histologic sections of the same developing tooth, which can appear to be different stages.

== Identification ==
=== Nomenclature ===
Teeth are named by their sets and also arch, class, type, and side. Teeth can belong to one of two sets of teeth: primary ("baby") teeth or permanent teeth. Often, "deciduous" may be used in place of "primary", and "adult" may be used for "permanent". "Succedaneous" refers to those teeth of the permanent dentition that replace primary teeth (incisors, canines, and premolars of the permanent dentition). Succedaneous would refer to these teeth as a group. Further, the name depends upon which arch the tooth is found in. The term, "maxillary", is given to teeth in the upper jaw and "mandibular" to those in the lower jaw. There are four classes of teeth: incisors, canines, premolars, and molars. Premolars are found only in permanent teeth; there are no premolars in deciduous teeth. Within each class, teeth may be classified into different traits. Incisors are divided further into central and lateral incisors. Among premolars and molars, there are first and second premolars, and first, second, and third molars. The side of the mouth in which a tooth is found may also be included in the name. For example, a specific name for a tooth may be "permanent maxillary left lateral incisor."

=== Numbering systems ===
Comparison of alphanumeric notation, Palmer notation, ISO 3950 (FDI) notation, Universal Numbering System, and paleoanthropology notation

There are several different dental notation systems for associating information to a specific tooth. The three most commons systems are the FDI World Dental Federation notation, Universal numbering system (dental), and Palmer notation method. The FDI system is used worldwide, and the universal is used widely in the United States.

Although the Palmer notation was supposedly superseded by the FDI World Dental Federation notation, it overwhelmingly continues to be the preferred method used by dental students and practitioners in the United Kingdom. It was originally termed the "Zsigmondy system" after the Austrian dentist Adolf Zsigmondy who developed the idea in 1861, using a Zsigmondy cross to record quadrants of tooth positions. The Palmer notation consists of a symbol (┘└ ┐┌) designating in which quadrant the tooth is found (from the dentist's perspective) and a number indicating the position from the midline. Permanent teeth are numbered 1 to 8, and primary teeth are indicated by a letter A to E.

The universal numbering system uses a unique letter or number for each tooth. The uppercase letters A through T are used for primary teeth and the numbers 1 - 32 are used for permanent teeth. The tooth designated "1" is the right maxillary third molar and the count continues along the upper teeth to the left side. Then the count begins at the left mandibular third molar, designated number 17, and continues along the bottom teeth to the right side.

The FDI system uses a two-digit numbering system in which the first number represents a tooth's quadrant and the second number represents the number of the tooth from the midline of the face. For permanent teeth, the upper right teeth begin with the number, "1". The upper left teeth begin with the number, "2". The lower left teeth begin with the number, "3". The lower right teeth begin with the number, "4". For primary teeth, the sequence of numbers goes 5, 6, 7, and 8 for the teeth in the upper right, upper left, lower left, and lower right respectively.

As a result, any given tooth has three different ways to identify it, depending on which notation system is used. The permanent right maxillary central incisor is identified by the number "8" in the universal system. In the FDI system, the same tooth is identified by the number "11". The palmer system uses the number and symbol, ^{1}, to identify the tooth. Further confusion may result if a number is given on a tooth without assuming (or specifying) a common notation method. Since the number, "12", may signify the permanent left maxillary first premolar in the universal system or the permanent right maxillary lateral incisor in the FDI system, the notation being used must be clear to prevent confusion.

In 1891, Victor Haderup devised a variant of eight tooth quadrant system in which plus (+) and minus (-) were used to differentiate between upper and lower quadrants, and between right and left quadrants (e.g., +1 = upper right central incisor; 1- = lower left central incisor). Primary teeth were numbered as upper right (05+ to 01+), lower left (-01 to -05). This system is still used in Denmark.

== Anatomic landmarks ==
=== Crown and root ===
The tooth is attached to the surrounding gingival tissue and alveolar bone (C) by fibrous attachments. The gingival fibers (H) run from the cementum (B) into the gingiva immediately apical to the junctional epithelial attachment and the periodontal ligament fibers (I), (J) and (K) run from the cementum into the adjacent cortex of the alveolar bone.

The term "crown" of a tooth can be used in two ways. The term "anatomic crown" of a tooth refers to the area above the cementoenamel junction (CEJ) or "neck" of the tooth. It is completely covered in enamel. The term "clinical crown" often is convenient in referring to any part of the tooth visible in the mouth, but as a rule the unqualified term "crown" refers to the anatomic crown. The bulk of the crown is composed of dentine, with the pulp chamber within. The crown is enclosed within bone before the tooth erupts, but after eruption the crown is almost always visible in an anatomically normal and clinically healthy mouth.

The anatomic root is found below the cementoenamel junction and is covered with cementum, whereas the clinical root is any part of a tooth not visible in the mouth. Similarly, the anatomic root is assumed in most circumstances. Dentin composes most of the root, which normally has pulp canals. The roots of teeth may be single in number (single-rooted teeth) or multiple. Canines and most premolars, except for maxillary first premolars, usually have one root. Maxillary first premolars and mandibular molars usually have two roots. Maxillary molars usually have three roots. The tooth is supported in bone by an attachment apparatus, known as the periodontium, which interacts with the root.

=== Surfaces ===
Surfaces that are nearest the cheeks or lips are referred to as either buccal (when found on posterior teeth nearest the cheeks) or labial (when found on anterior teeth nearest the lips). Those nearest the tongue are known as lingual. Lingual surfaces can also be described as palatal when found on maxillary teeth beside the hard palate.

Surfaces that aid in chewing are known as occlusal on posterior teeth and incisal on anterior teeth. Surfaces nearest the junction of the crown and root are referred to as cervical, and those closest to the apex of the root are referred to as apical. The tissue surrounding apex is called periapical.

Mesial signifies a surface closer to the median line of the face, which is located on a vertical axis between the eyes, down the nose, and between the contact of the central incisors. Surfaces further away from the median line are described as distal.

=== Cusp ===
A cusp is an elevation on an occlusal surface of posterior teeth and canines. It contributes to a significant portion of the tooth's surface. Canines have one cusp. Maxillary premolars and the mandibular first premolars usually have two cusps. Mandibular second premolars frequently have three cusps--- one buccal and two lingual. Maxillary molars have two buccal cusps and two lingual cusps. A fifth cusp that may form on the maxillary first molar is known as the cusp of Carabelli. Mandibular molars may have five or four cusps.

=== Cingulum ===
A cingulum is a convexity mesiodistally resembling a girdle, encircling the lingual surface at the cervical third, found on the lingual surface of anterior teeth. It is frequently identifiable as an inverted V-shaped ridge, and its appearance is comparable to a girdle. All anterior teeth are formed from four centers of development, referred to as lobes. Three are located on the facial side of the tooth, and one on the lingual side. The cingulum forms from this lingual lobe of development. The majority of a lingual surface's cervical third is made up of the cingulum. On lower incisors, a cingulum usually is poorly developed or absent. Maxillary canines have a large, well-developed cingulum, whereas the cingulum of mandibular canines is smoother and rounded.

=== Ridges ===
Ridges are any linear, flat elevations on teeth, and they are named according to their location. The buccal ridge runs cervico-occlusally in approximately the center of the buccal surface of premolars. The labial ridge is one that runs cervico-incisally in approximately the center of the labial surface of canines. The lingual ridge extends from the cingulum to the cusp tip on the lingual surface of most canines. The cervical ridge runs mesiodistally on the cervical third of the buccal surface of the crown. These are found on all primary teeth but only on the permanent molars.

Cusp ridges are ridges that radiate from cusp tips. There are two marginal ridges, mesial and distal, present on all teeth. On anterior teeth, they are located on the mesial and distal borders of the lingual surface; on posterior teeth, they are located on the mesial and distal borders of the occlusal surface. Triangular ridges are those that project from the cusp tips of premolar and molars to the central groove. Transverse ridges are formed by the union of two triangular ridges on posterior teeth. The joining of buccal and lingual triangular ridges is usually named as an example. The oblique ridge is found on the occlusal surfaces of maxillary molars. It is formed by the union of the distal cusp ridge of the mesiolingual cusp and the triangular ridge of the distobuccal cusp. The oblique ridges usually forms the distal boundary of the central fossa.

=== Developmental groove ===
The teeth demonstrating the fewest developmental grooves are the mandibular central and lateral incisors. However, the canines show the most prominent developmental grooves, because they have robust anchorage to the bone.

=== Embrasures ===
Embrasures are triangularly shaped spaces located between the proximal surfaces of adjacent teeth. The borders of embrasures are formed by the interdental papilla of the gingiva, the adjacent teeth, and the contact point where the two teeth meet. There are four embrasures for every contact area: facial (also called labial or buccal), lingual (or palatal), occlusal or incisal, and cervical or interproximal space. The cervical embrasure usually is filled by the interdental papilla from the gingiva; in the absence of adequate gingival tissue a black angle, or Angularis Nigra is visible.

Embrasures have three functions. They form spillways between teeth to direct food away from the gingiva. Also, they provide a mechanism for teeth to be more self cleansing. Lastly, they protect the gingiva from undue frictional trauma but also provide the proper degree of stimulation to the tissues.

=== Mamelons ===
Mamelons are usually found as three small bumps on the incisal edges of anterior teeth. They are the remnants of three lobes of formation of these teeth, the fourth lobe represented by the cingulum. Since this surface of the tooth is the first to wear away from attrition, mamelons may not be visible on teeth of older people. Instead, the best chance to see this characteristic is soon after eruption of the tooth into the mouth.

== Distinguishing characteristics of teeth ==
=== Incisor ===
Eight incisors are anterior teeth, four in the upper arch and four in the lower. Their function is for shearing or cutting food during chewing. There are no cusps on the teeth. Instead, the surface area of the tooth used in eating is called the incisal ridge or incisal edge. Though similar, there are some minor differences between the primary and permanent incisors.

==== Maxillary central incisor ====
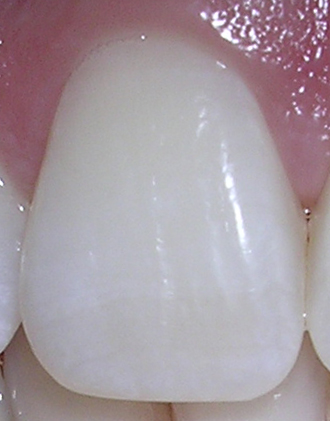
A permanent maxillary central incisor

The maxillary central incisors are usually the most visible teeth, since they are the top center two teeth in the front of a mouth, and they are located mesial to the maxillary lateral incisor. The overall length of the deciduous maxillary central incisor is 16 mm on average, with the crown being 6 mm and the root being 10 mm. In comparison to the permanent maxillary central incisor, the ratio of the root length to the crown length is greater in the deciduous tooth. The diameter of the crown mesiodistally is greater than the length cervicoincisally, which makes the tooth appear wider rather than taller from a labial viewpoint.

The permanent maxillary central incisor is the widest tooth mesiodistally in comparison to any other anterior tooth. It is larger than the neighboring lateral incisor and is usually not as convex on its labial surface. As a result, the central incisor appears to be more rectangular or square in shape. The mesial incisal angle is sharper than the distal incisal angle. When this tooth is newly erupted into the mouth, the incisal edges have three rounded features called mamelons. Mamelons disappear with time as the enamel wears away by friction.

==== Maxillary lateral incisor ====
The maxillary lateral incisor is the tooth located distally from both maxillary central incisors of the mouth and mesially from both maxillary canines.

==== Mandibular central incisor ====
The mandibular central incisor is the tooth located on the jaw, adjacent to the midline of the face. It is mesial from both mandibular lateral incisors.

==== Mandibular lateral incisor ====
The mandibular lateral incisor is the tooth located distally from both mandibular central incisors of the mouth and mesially from both mandibular canines.

=== Canine (cuspid) ===
Both the maxillary and mandibular canines are called the "cornerstone" of the mouth because they are all located three teeth away from the midline, and separate the premolars from the incisors. The location of the canines reflect their dual function as they complement both the premolars and incisors during chewing. Nonetheless, the most common action of the canines is tearing of food. There is a single cusp on canines, and they resemble the prehensile teeth found in carnivorous animals. Though similar, there are some minor differences.

==== Maxillary canine ====
The maxillary canine is the tooth located laterally from both maxillary lateral incisors of the mouth but mesially from both maxillary first premolars. It is the longest tooth in total length, from root to the incisal edge, in the mouth.

==== Mandibular canine ====
The mandibular canine is the tooth located distally from both mandibular lateral incisors of the mouth but mesially from both mandibular first premolars.

=== Premolar (bicuspid) ===
Premolars are found distal to canines and mesial to molars. They are divided into first and second premolars. The functions of premolars vary. There are no deciduous premolars. Instead, the teeth that precede the permanent premolars are the deciduous molars.

==== Maxillary first premolar ====
The maxillary first premolar is the tooth located laterally from both the maxillary canines of the mouth but mesially from both maxillary second premolars. The function of this premolar is similar to that of canines in regard to tearing being the principal action during chewing. There are two cusps on maxillary first premolars, and the buccal cusp is sharp enough to resemble the prehensile teeth found in carnivorous animals. There is a distinctive concavity on the cervical third of the crown extending onto the root. The maxillary first premolar is bifurcated, typically having two roots.

==== Maxillary second premolar ====
The maxillary second premolar is the tooth located laterally from both the maxillary first premolars of the mouth but mesially from both maxillary first molars. The function of this premolar is similar to that of first molars in regard to grinding being the principal action during chewing. There are two cusps on maxillary second premolars, but both of them are less sharp than those of the maxillary first premolars.

==== Mandibular first premolar ====
The mandibular first premolar is the tooth located laterally from both the mandibular canines of the mouth but mesially from both mandibular second premolars. The function of this premolar is similar to that of canines in regard to tearing being the principal action during mastication. Mandibular first premolars have two cusps. The one large and sharp is located on the buccal side of the tooth. Since the lingual cusp is small and nonfunctional, which means it is not active in chewing, the mandibular first premolar resembles a small canine.

==== Mandibular second premolar ====
The mandibular second premolar is the tooth located distally from both the mandibular first premolars of the mouth but mesially from both mandibular first molars. The function of this premolar is to assist the mandibular first molar during mastication. Mandibular second premolars have three cusps. There is one large cusp on the buccal side of the tooth. The lingual cusps are well developed and functional, which means the cusps assist during chewing. Therefore, whereas the mandibular first premolar resembles a small canine, the mandibular second premolar is more like the first molar.

=== Molar ===
Molars are the most posterior teeth in the mouth. Their function is to grind food during chewing. The number of cusps, and thus the overall appearance, vary among the different molars and between people. There are great differences between the deciduous molars and those of the permanent molars, even though their functions are similar. Permanent maxillary molars are not considered to have any teeth that precede them. Despite being named "molars", the deciduous molars are followed by permanent premolars. The third molars are commonly called "wisdom teeth."

==== Maxillary first molar ====
The maxillary first molar is the tooth located laterally from both the maxillary second premolars of the mouth but mesially from both maxillary second molars. There are usually four cusps on maxillary molars, two on the buccal and two palatal. Most times there is also a fifth cusp, called the Cusp of Carabelli, located on the mesiolingual aspect of the tooth.

==== Maxillary second molar ====
The maxillary second molar is the tooth located laterally from both the maxillary first molars of the mouth but mesially from both maxillary third molars. This is true only in permanent teeth. In deciduous teeth, the maxillary second molar is the last tooth in the mouth and does not have a third molar behind it. The deciduous maxillary second molar is also the most likely of the deciduous teeth to have an oblique ridge. There are usually four cusps on maxillary molars, two buccal and two palatal.

==== Maxillary third molar ====
The maxillary third molar is the tooth located laterally from both the maxillary second molars of the mouth with no tooth posterior to it in permanent teeth. In deciduous teeth, there is no maxillary third molar. There are usually four cusps on maxillary molars, two buccal and two palatal. Nonetheless, for this tooth, there are great variances among third molars, and a specific description of a third molar will not hold true in all cases.

==== Mandibular first molar ====
The mandibular first molar is the tooth located distally from both the mandibular second premolars of the mouth but mesially from both mandibular second molars. It is located on the mandibular arch of the mouth, and generally opposes the maxillary first molars and the maxillary 2nd premolar. This arrangement is known as Class I occlusion. There are usually five well-developed cusps on mandibular first molars: two on the buccal, two lingual, and one distal.

==== Mandibular second molar ====
The mandibular second molar is the tooth located distally from both the mandibular first molars of the mouth but mesially from both mandibular third molars. This is true only in permanent teeth. In deciduous teeth, the mandibular second molar is the last tooth in the mouth and does not have a third molar behind it. Though there is more variation between individuals than in the first mandibular molar, there are usually four cusps on mandibular second molars: two buccal and two lingual.

==== Mandibular third molar ====
The mandibular third molar is the tooth located distally from both the mandibular second molars of the mouth with no tooth posterior to it in permanent teeth. In deciduous teeth, there is no mandibular third molar. For this tooth, there are great variances among third molars, and a specific description of a third molar will not hold true in all cases
