= Foramen cecum (dental) =

The Foramen cecum, in dental anthropology, is a minor expression of the protostylid of the tooth. It is thus indirectly related to the five non-metric dental crown traits. According to dental, biological studies, racially mixed populations have been discovered with deformed Foramen cecums, resulting in unique tooth groove patterns. Some dentists and scientists have hypothesized that Foramen cecums could in fact be a trait frequency exhibiting sexual dimorphism.

Fossas and pits located in the protosylid, a Foramen cecum, have seemingly become rarer and rare over time. Most populations suffer from furrows of the cusps; most, however, do not develop problems located in the protosylid.

Foramen cecum can be present on the lateral incisors and first molars independently. It is said that the foramen cecum is commonly be found on the palatal surface of the maxillary lateral incisors, but research on it is scarce. The foramen cecum is also described as a depression or small furrow situated between the cingulum and the lingual fossa. Dahlberg (1950) was the first to identify it as an accessory or supernumerary cusp on the primary maxillary molars.

== Epidemiology ==
Americanoid protostylid is described as a feature by A. Zoubov because of the high frequency of foramen cecum seen in American populations and the low prevalence in Europe, Africa and Asia populations. Based on interracial variable characteristics Mongoloid dental complex, frequency of protostylid in 5 different racial groups are 44.7% in Japanese, 89.0% in Pima Indian, 67.3% in Eskimo, 14.5% in American Caucasian and 17.0% in American Negro respectively. According to K. Hanihara, protostylid cusp is uncommon in different populations and modern human groups, most Asians, which can distinguish the dental complex of Caucasoid and Mongoloid Negroid. N. Aragon et al discovered that protostylid was missing from the sample in the primary teeth case and present with groove expression in the permanent teeth in a native Colombian sample.

== Embryological development ==
The foramen cecum, in embryological terms, represents a minor but significant developmental feature of the dental lamina during odontogenesis. It arises from the interaction between the ectoderm-derived enamel organ and the underlying mesenchymal tissue, contributing to the overall morphology of the tooth. The formation of the foramen cecum is closely associated with the early invagination processes that shapes the lingual surface of the developing incisors and molars.

During the cap and bell stages of tooth development, differential proliferation of inner enamel epithelium and condensation of the dental papilla dictate the eventual presence or absence of this structure. Studies on embryological development suggest that genetic and epigenetic factors influence the depth and expression of the foramen cecum, with some populations exhibiting greater variability due to inherited morphological traits.

Although classical embryology texts describe the foramen cecum as a consistent feature of the lingual surface of the mandibular lateral incisors, it is most commonly seen in the permanent dentition, particularly in the maxillary lateral incisors and mandibular lateral incisors which are teeth 32/ 42/12 or 22. It is primarily located on the lingual surface, though variations may occur. A review of developmental biology studies over the past two decades has shown limited direct investigation into its formation, with most insights derived from histological observations of human fetal teeth. These observations describe the foramen cecum as a shallow depression formed by transient invaginations in the enamel organ, typically resolving before complete enamel deposition.

The presence of the foramen cecum in permanent dentition is considered a morphological variation rather than a developmental defect. It represents an evolutionary remnant of early tooth patterning, much like other non-metric dental traits such as the protostylid and Carabelli's cusp. Its variability across populations has implications in both evolutionary biology and forensic odontology, where it may serve as a minor but valuable indicator of ancestral dental morphology.

== Clinical significance and radiographic features ==
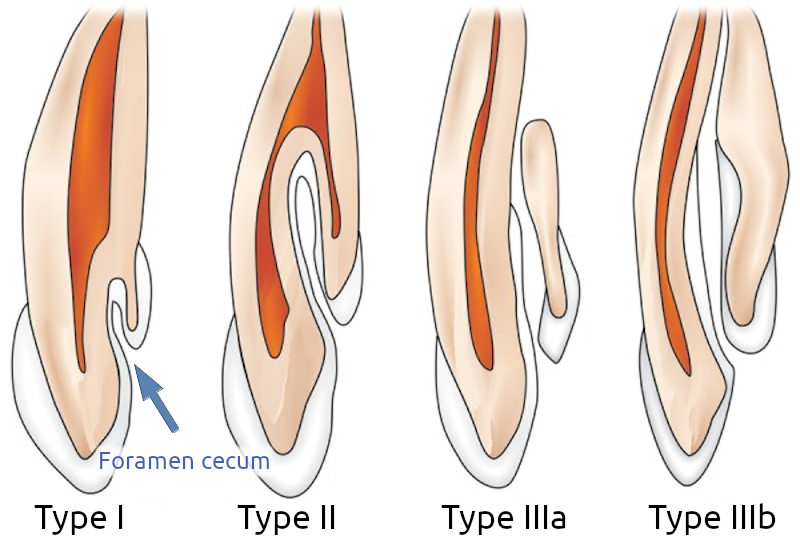
Dens invaginatus(figure 1)

The foramen cecum has become a rare clinical finding nowadays. However, the presence of a foramen cecum, particularly on the maxillary lateral incisor (MLI), is significantly associated with dens in dente(figure 1). Studies have reported a higher prevalence of dens in dente when a foramen cecum is present (17.27%) rather than foramen cecum present alone (9.09%) or dens in dente present alone (8.18%).

Clinical management:

In brief, foramen cecum is an important anatomical structure that may indicate the presence of dens in dente, enabling early detection and preventive management. Early conservative management, such as sealing the pit, can be taken to help prevent bacterial invasion and preserve the tooth.

Lack of diagnosis and treatment of dens in dente associated with a foramen cecum can lead to pulp disease, tooth decay, and eventual tooth loss.

== Associated pathologies ==
The most common pathology associated with the dental foramen cecum is dens in dente (also known as dens invaginatus). This anomaly occurs during tooth development when the enamel and dentine fold inwards towards the pulp chamber. On dental radiographs, it appears as a 'tooth within a tooth' due to the invaginated enamel lining. The exact cause of this anomaly remains unclear, but contributing factors may include genetic influences, infection of the tooth germ, trauma between adjacent teeth during development, or other developmental disturbances.

Dens in dente has been reported to originate from a deep fold of the foramen cecum during development, occasionally leading to the formation of a second apical foramen. The foramen cecum serves as a key radiographic landmark in diagnosing dens in dente. This condition increases the risk of pulpal disease, as the invaginated dentine may be exposed to oral bacteria, making the tooth more susceptible to infection and inflammation. Early detection of dens in dente is crucial, as timely intervention can prevent the need for invasive treatments.

Research suggests that dens in dente can alter the morphology of the root canal system, complicating endodontic treatment. In some cases, if root canal therapy is unsuccessful, tooth extraction becomes necessary. Thus, preventative measures are crucial, such as the application of fissure sealants, which can help reduce the risk of infection and dental caries in affected teeth.

While dens in dente can occur in any tooth, the most commonly affected is the maxillary lateral incisor (MLI), accounting for 80.3% of cases, with 43% occurring bilaterally. The MLI is also the most common tooth to present with a foramen cecum on its lingual surface, leading to investigations into its possible role in dens in dente development. Other affected teeth include central incisors (19.02%) and canines (0.4%). Studies also indicate that males are more frequently affected than females, with a reported male-to-female ratio of 2:1.

=== Classification of dens in dente ===
Dens in dente is classified into three types based on the extent of invagination:

• Type I: The enamel and dentine fold inwards but do not extend beyond the amelodentinal junction, remaining within the crown.

• Type II: The invagination extends into the pulp chamber but does not communicate with the periodontal ligament, as it remains within the root canal system.

• Type III: The invagination extends through the root, forming a connection with the periodontal ligament but typically not with the tooth's pulp.

== Differential diagnosis ==
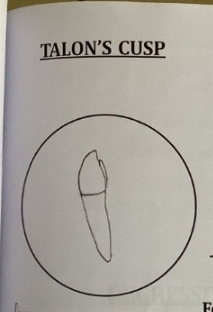
Talon cusp(figure 2)

Research indicates that the condition to consider when discussing the differential diagnosis for foramen cecum includes dens in dente and talons cusp(figure 2).

Dens in dente, also known as, dens invaginatus, commonly affects the maxillary lateral incisors and has a substantial correlation between the presence of the foramen cecum and dens in dente. As mentioned earlier, the invagination is thought to result from the rapid and aggressive proliferation of a section of the enamel's inner epithelium, extending into the dental papilla. Other proposed causes include the fusion of two developing tooth buds, infections, trauma, or the protrusion of part of the enamel organ.

Talons cusp is also a possible differential, as it is a protruding cusp that extends toward the incisal border from the cingulum. With pulp tissue frequently present, it may radiographically resemble an "eagle's talon" and is clinically apparent as a T- or V-shaped structure. Anterior teeth with uneven lingual surfaces are involved in both talon cusp and foramen cecum abnormalities. Because they originate close to the cingulum, severe foramen cecum variants may mimic talon cusp Type III, necessitating imaging to rule out pulp extension. Talon cusp care frequently entails prophylactic sealing or occlusal correction, but foramen cecum usually requires no intervention unless problematic, so clinicians must employ intraoral radiographs to differentiate between these entities. Upon radiographical examination, the talon cusp exhibits a V-shaped radiopacity with pulp extension into the cusp, whereas, the foramen cecum appears as a dim pit with little pulp involvement until it is connected to dens invaginatus.

With that said, relevant clinical examination, radiographs and investigations are required to rule out differential diagnosis and come up with a definitive diagnosis for the foramen cecum.

== Management and treatment considerations ==
Literature indicates that a deep fold in the foramen cecum during tooth development causes dens in dente, which can occasionally lead to the formation of a second apical foramen. A significant invagination of both enamel and dentin starting from the foramen cecum and likely extending down towards the root is seen in the affected tooth by this condition. Consequently, the foramen cecum may serve as an early clinical indicator of this malformation. In numerous instances, dens in dente can increase the risk of pulp disease due to exposure of dentin in the invaginated region to the oral environment, making it more susceptible to dental caries. Applying dental sealants to protect against cavities, pulp infections, and early tooth loss as conservative preventive treatment will be ideal. When there is pulp involvement endodontic therapy is needed; however, appropriate adjustments to the treatment should be made due to the anatomical complexity of teeth. Therefore, dentists should pay attention to the foramen cecum, as it can suggest the presence of dens in dente. With appropriate initial conservative treatment, it may be feasible to save the affected tooth.
