= Enamel cord =

Structure in tooth development

The enamel cord, also called enamel septum, is a localization of cells on an enamel organ that appear from the outer enamel epithelium to an enamel knot. The function of the enamel cord and the enamel knot is not known, but they are believed to play a role in the placement of the first cusp developed in a tooth.
