= Enamel niche =

Structure of developing teeth

The enamel niche is a structure that appears in a histologic slide of a developing tooth from sectioning the slide in a single plane. The enamel organ looks to be connected to the oral epithelium by two or more strands of dental lamina. The enamel niche is the name of the mesenchymal cells which look to be surrounded by the strands of the dental lamina. In actuality, there is no mesenchyme completely surrounded by dental lamina. This appearance is due to a funnel shaped depression of the dental lamina. These cases are a result from the dental lamina being a curved structure while the slide contains tissue taken in one plane.
