= Cervical loop =

Part of enamel on developing tooth

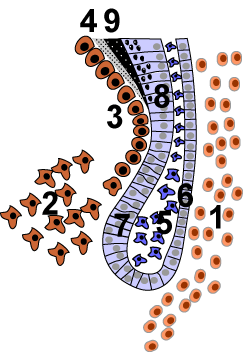
The cervical loop area: (1) dental follicle cells, (2) dental mesenchyme, (3) Odontoblasts, (4) Dentin, (5) stellate reticulum, (6) outer enamel epithelium, (7)inner enamel epithelium, (8) ameloblasts, (9) enamel.

The cervical loop is the location on an enamel organ in a developing tooth where the outer enamel epithelium and the inner enamel epithelium join. The cervical loop is a histologic term indicating a specific epithelial structure at the apical side of the tooth germ, consisting of loosely aggregated stellate reticulum in the center surrounded by stratum intermedium. These tissues are enveloped by a basal layer of epithelium known on the outside of the tooth as outer enamel epithelium and on the inside as inner enamel epithelium. During root formation the inner layers of epithelium disappear and only the basal layers are left creating Hertwig's epithelial root sheath (HERS). At this point it is usually referred to as HERS instead of the cervical loop to indicate the structural difference.

== Cervical loop as epithelial stem cell niche ==
It is thought that the central epithelial tissue of the cervical loop, the stellate reticulum, acts as a stem cell reservoir. In continuously growing teeth such as the rodent incisor the original structure of the cervical loop is maintained and no HERS forms. The stem cells provide the epithelial progeny to sustain the continuous growth.
