= Reduced enamel epithelium =

Cell layer in tooth development

The reduced enamel epithelium, sometimes called reduced dental epithelium, overlies a developing tooth and is formed by two layers: a layer of ameloblast cells and the adjacent layer of cuboidal cells (outer enamel epithelium) from the dental lamina. As the cells of the reduced enamel epithelium degenerate, the tooth is revealed progressively with its eruption into the mouth. The degeneration of reduced enamel epithelium also mediates the initial epithelial attachment to the tooth, which is called the junctional epithelium.

The reduced enamel epithelium consist of:

- Inner enamel epithelium
- Outer enamel epithelium
