= Succedaneous tooth =

Permanent variety of tooth

The succedaneous teeth are the permanent teeth that replace the deciduous teeth. Permanent molars are not succedaneous teeth because they do not replace any primary teeth. Succedaneous teeth originate from successional laminae whereas permanent molars originate from the general dental lamina.

They begin to form as early as 24 weeks.

== See also ==
- Dental anatomy
