= Foramen cecum =

Foramen cecum or foramen caecum (from the Latin caecus meaning blind) can refer to:

- Foramen cecum (frontal bone)
- Foramen cecum (tongue)
- Foramen cecum (dental)
