= Epithelial root sheath =

Cells which initiate dentin formation in a developing tooth

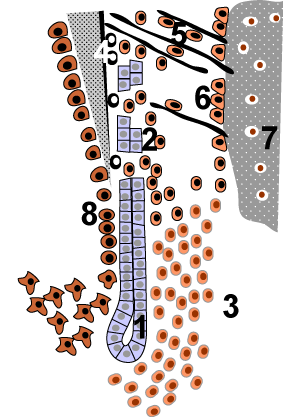
- (1) The HERS, (2) ERM, (3) Dental follicle, (4) cementoblasts, (5) periodontal ligament, (6) alveolar cells, (7) bone, (8) odontoblasts.

Details

Identifiers
- Latin: vagina epithelialis radicis
- TE: root sheath_by_E5.4.1.1.2.3.26 E5.4.1.1.2.3.26

The Hertwig epithelial root sheath (HERS) or epithelial root sheath is a proliferation of epithelial cells located at the cervical loop of the enamel organ in a developing tooth. Hertwig epithelial root sheath initiates the formation of dentin in the root of a tooth by causing the differentiation of odontoblasts from the dental papilla. The root sheath eventually disintegrates with the periodontal ligament, but residual pieces that do not completely disappear are seen as epithelial cell rests of Malassez (ERM). These rests can become cystic, presenting future periodontal infections.

== Structure ==
Hertwig epithelial root sheath is derived from the inner and outer enamel epithelium of the enamel organ.

== Function ==
The sheath is also responsible for multiple or accessory roots (medial growth) and lateral or accessory canals in the root (break in epithelium). It is controversial, but HERS may be involved in cementogenesis and the secretion of cementum, or that HERS-derived products might be related to enamel-related molecules, and that these proteins might initiate acellular cementum formation.

== Other animals ==
While in mammals the HERS is rather a transient structure, in amphibians it is more or less a permanent one. Here the root epithelium does not fenestrate like in mammalians. Within vertebrates 3 distinct stages of HERS development can be observed.

1. In teleosts and chondrichthyans no HERS or root is really formed, and tooth development is restricted to crown development. An inflexible joint is formed between the tooth and the bone at the apical end of the tooth where the epithelium remains open.
2. In amphibians and non-crocodilian reptiles a continuous root sheath or HERS is formed without fragmentation of the epithelium. Once again a rather rigid connection between bone and tooth is formed at the apical end of the tooth where no epithelium is present.
3. In crocodilians and mammals the HERS is a transient structure and fragments to form the epithelial cell rests of Malassez. Through the gaps in the root epithelium elements of the periodontal ligament can migrate and form a flexible connection between bone and root.

== History ==
Hertwig epithelial root sheath was not discovered in any mammalian species. Instead this epithelial structure was discovered by Oskar Hertwig in 1874 in an amphibian (see notes below for further discussion in other animals).

== See also ==
- Cementum
- Dentin
- Human tooth development
- Tooth eruption
