= Cuticle (disambiguation) =

A cuticle, or cuticula, is any of a variety of tough but flexible, non-mineral outer coverings of an organism, or parts of an organism, that provide protection, including:

- Cuticle (hair), the outermost part of a hair shaft
- Cuticle (nail) or eponychium, in human anatomy, the thickened layer of skin surrounding finger- and toenails
- Primary enamel cuticle, a covering of the crown of a newly erupted tooth
- Arthropod cuticle, the major part of the integument, including most of the exoskeleton, of the Arthropoda
- Plant cuticle, or cuticula, a waxy polymeric film covering all aerial plant surfaces
- Pileipellis or cuticle, the uppermost protective layer of a fungal fruit body
