= Vestibular lamina =

Structure between human cheek and gums

The vestibular lamina is responsible for the formation of the vestibule (the space bordered by the junction of the gingiva and the tissue of the inner cheek) and arises from a group of cells called the primary epithelial band. This band is created at about 37 days of development in utero. The vestibular lamina forms shortly after the dental lamina and is positioned right in front of it. The vestibule is formed by the proliferation of the vestibular lamina into the ectomesenchyme. The vestibular lamina is usually contrasted with the dental lamina, which develops concurrently and is involved with developing teeth. Both the vestibular lamina and the dental lamina arise from a group of epithelial cells, called the primary epithelial band.

The vestibular lamina develops at 6th week of the intrauterine life as a result of proliferation of the primitive ectoderm that lines the primitive oral cavity. The cells enlarge and then degenerate to form a cleft that separates the lips and cheeks at one side from the developing jaws and teeth at the other side. This cleft is the oral vestibule.

== Development ==
The proliferation of the lining of the stomodeum (ectoderm) gives rise to the oral epithelium. During the initiation stage of early tooth development (6 weeks in utero), the oral epithelium goes through mitosis and condenses to form a primary epithelial band. In the 7th week in utero, the primary epithelial band cells continue to proliferate and invaginate. They then degenerate to form the vestibular sulcus that separates the lips and cheeks from the jaw and teeth, hence forming the vestibular lamina at the buccal/labial side of the oral cavity. Concurrently, the dental lamina is also being developed from the primary epithelial band at the lingual/palatal side of the oral cavity for morphogenesis and histogenesis of the development of the teeth.

=== Functions and relationship with dental lamina ===
At about the 7th week in utero, the dental lamina is produced, and it serves as the primordium for the ectodermal portion of the deciduous teeth. Later during the development of the jaws, permanent molars arise directly from the distal extension of the dental lamina. The vestibular lamina is the thickening of oral epithelium in a facial or buccal direction from the dental lamina. Meanwhile, a cleft will form a groove that becomes the area of the mucobuccal or mucolabial fold in the future vestibule. Furthermore, vestibular lamina will subsequently hollow and forms the oral vestibule between the alveolar portion of the jaws and the lips and cheeks. Recent studies have found that both the dental lamina and vestibular laminae jointly give rise to the large tooth primordia in the cheek region of the maxilla. Also, in mice, human and sheep, the vestibular lamina and dental lamina originate from a common epithelial placode- odontogenic epithelial zone which is in the upper lip region.

== Clinical considerations ==
To date, there is little clinical evidence regarding the clinical implications of vestibular lamina to date. However, since the vestibular lamina is responsible for the formation of oral vestibule, a correlation might be suggested between the poor development of vestibular lamina and a number of clinical implications - namely that shallow vestibules may negatively impact on denture retention, cause difficulty in brushing teeth, and also contribute to gingival recession.

=== Denture retention (secondary retention) ===
The surrounding musculature and the shape of denture borders and flanges may affect the degree of retention. Factors affecting denture retention may be regarded as secondary retention. In this case, a shallow vestibule may lead to resistance against proper denture fitting.

Polished surfaces of the denture should therefore be properly shaped for patients with atypical oral and facial musculature. The occlusal plane should also be at the correct level to ensure that the arch form of the teeth is in the neutral zone. The denture bases are properly extended to cover the maximum area as possible.

When patients encounter difficulty or discomfort chewing or brushing, vestibular deepening can be considered but this is uncommon.

=== Gingival recession ===
A shallow vestibule can also contribute towards gingival recession because of dissipation of the gingival attachment due to less space. Periodontal plastic surgery focuses on correction or elimination of problems related to gingival recession, shallow vestibule or lack of attached gingiva. These can either be functional or purely aesthetic procedures.

Free gingival autograft is one of the more common techniques used for a gingival recession in areas of inadequate attached gingiva in the mandibular anterior region. Conversely, coronally repositioned flaps for the treatment of gingival recession will lead to decreased vestibular depth which may impact oral hygiene or denture retention.
