= Stratum intermedium =

Cell layer in tooth development

Details
- Location: Developing tooth

Identifiers
- Latin: Stratum intermedium

The stratum intermedium in a developing tooth is a layer of two or three cells between the inner enamel epithelium and the newly forming cells of the stellate reticulum. It first appears during the early bell stage of tooth development, at around the 14th week of intrauterine life. These cells are closely attached by desmosomes and gap junctions. The stratum intermedium has a notably high alkaline phosphatase activity. This layer, along with the inner enamel epithelium, is responsible for the tooth enamel formation. It is a part of the dental (enamel) organ. Stratum intermedium stores glycogen. It is absent in the part of the tooth germ that outlines the root portions of the tooth which does not form enamel.
