= Primary enamel cuticle =

Membrane covering erupting teeth

Primary enamel cuticle, also called Nasmyth's membrane, is thin membrane of tissue also known as reduced enamel epithelium (REE) produced by the ameloblast, that covers the tooth once it has erupted. This tissue is primarily basal lamina. It is usually worn away by mastication and cleaning. The primary enamel cuticle protects enamel from resorption by cells of the dental sac and also secretes desmolytic enzymes for elimination of the dental sac, allowing fusion between reduced enamel epithelium and oral epithelium. This process allows eruption of the tooth without bleeding.

== See also ==
- Tooth development
