= Outer enamel epithelium =

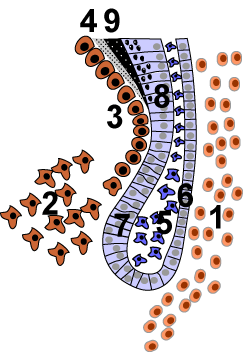
- The cervical loop area: (1) dental follicle cells, (2) dental mesenchyme, (3) odontoblasts, (4) dentin, (5) stellate reticulum, (6) outer enamel epithelium, (7) inner enamel epithelium, (8) ameloblasts, (9) enamel.

Details

Identifiers
- Latin: epithelium enameleum externum
- TE: enamel epithelium_by_E5.4.1.1.2.3.12 E5.4.1.1.2.3.12

The outer enamel epithelium, also known as the external enamel epithelium, is a layer of cuboidal cells located on the periphery of the enamel organ in a developing tooth. This layer is first seen during the bell stage.

The rim of the enamel organ, where the outer and inner enamel epithelium join is called the cervical loop.
