= Stellate reticulum =

Cells present in a developing tooth

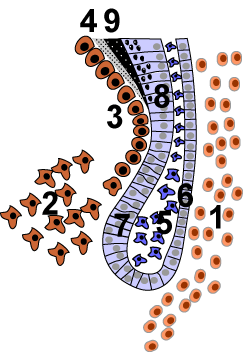
- The cervical loop area: (1) dental follicle cells, (2) dental mesenchyme, (3) odontoblasts, (4) dentin, (5) stellate reticulum, (6) outer enamel epithelium, (7) inner enamel epithelium, (8) ameloblasts, (9) enamel.

Details
- Location: Developing tooth

Identifiers
- Latin: reticulum stellatum

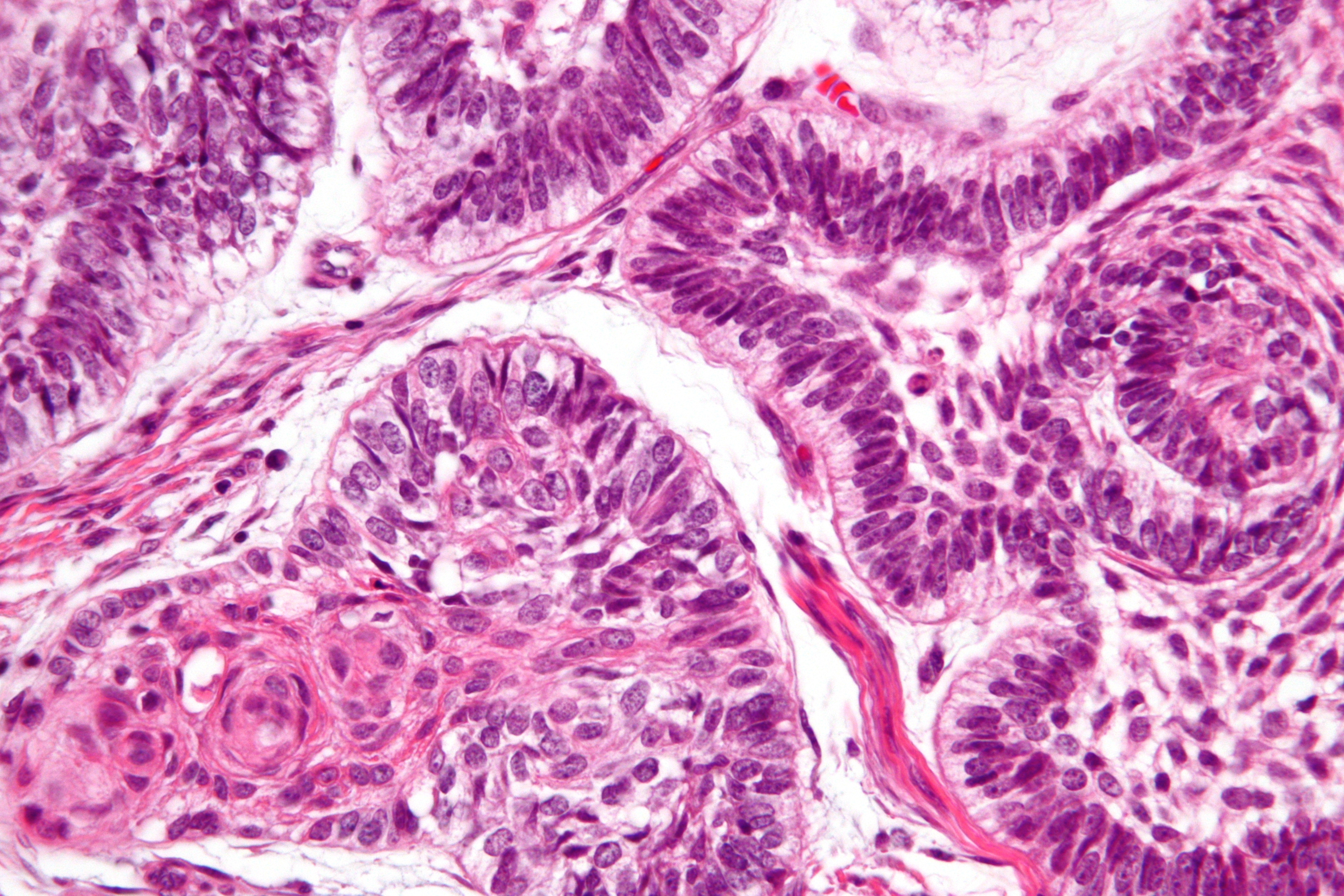
Micrograph showing stellate reticulum in an ameloblastoma. H&E stain.

In animal tooth development, the stellate reticulum is a group of cells located in the center of the enamel organ of a developing tooth. These cells are star-shaped (hence stellate) and synthesize glycosaminoglycans. As glycosaminoglycans are produced, water is drawn in between the cells, stretching them apart. As they are moved further away from one another, the stellate reticular cells maintain contact with one another through desmosomes, resulting in their unique appearance. The stellate reticulum is lost after the first layer of enamel is laid down. This brings cells in the inner enamel epithelium closer to blood vessels at the periphery.
