= Enamel organ =

Aggregate of cells involved in tooth development

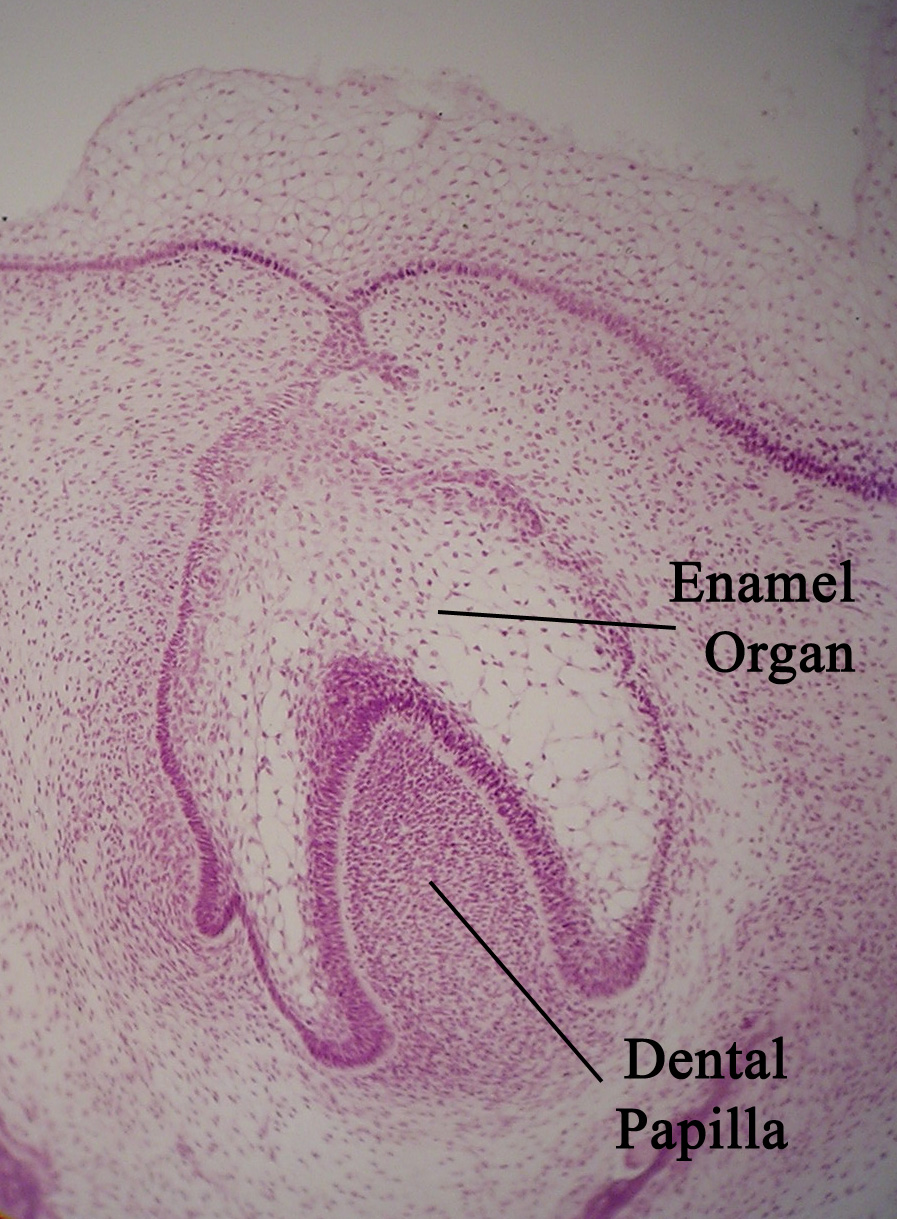
- Enamel organ

Details

Identifiers
- Latin: organum enameleum
- MeSH: D004658
- TE: organ_by_E5.4.1.1.2.3.5 E5.4.1.1.2.3.5

The enamel organ, also known as the dental organ, is a cellular aggregation seen in a developing tooth and it lies above the dental papilla. The enamel organ which is differentiated from the primitive oral epithelium lining the stomodeum. The enamel organ is responsible for the formation of enamel, initiation of dentine formation, establishment of the shape of a tooth's crown, and establishment of the dentoenamel junction.

The enamel organ has four layers; the inner enamel epithelium, outer enamel epithelium, stratum intermedium, and the stellate reticulum.

The dental papilla, the differentiated ectomesenchyme deep to the enamel organ, will produce dentin and the dental pulp. The surrounding ectomesenchyme tissue, the dental follicle, is the primitive cementum, periodontal ligament and alveolar bone beneath the tooth root. The site where the internal enamel epithelium and external enamel epithelium coalesce is the cervical root, important in proliferation of the dental root.

== Tooth development ==
Tooth development begins at week 6 in utero, in the oral epithelium. The process is divided into three stages:

1. Initiation
2. Morphogenesis and
3. Histogenesis

At the end of week 7 i.u., localised proliferations of cells in the dental laminae form round and oval swellings known as tooth buds, which will eventually develop into mesenchymal cells and surround the enamel organ. Each epithelial swelling and the surrounding mesenchymal cells form a tooth germ.

Tooth germs are the primitive structure of teeth; their formation is in three distinct stages: bud stage, cap stage, bell stage.

The stages are based on the degree of development of enamel organ. Oral epithelium forms the tooth enamel while the ectomesenchyme forms the pulp and dentine of the tooth. The ectomesenchyme lies deep to the oral epithelium.

=== Bud Stage ===
This is the initial stage of tooth development, which occurs at week 8 i.u.. Proliferation of dental lamina occurs, forming small tooth buds which are spherical or ovoid condensations of epithelial cells, now known as the enamel organ. The enamel organ consists of peripherally located, low columnar cells and centrally located polygonal cells. The enamel organ is also surrounded by proliferating mesenchymal cells, which results in the condensation of two distinct areas:

1. The dental papilla: below the enamel organ
2. The tooth sac: ectomesenchymal condensation of the area surrounding the tooth bud and dental papilla.

Both the dental papilla and the tooth sac are not structurally defined in the bud stage, and will become more defined in subsequent stages (Cap and Bell stages). The interaction and signalling between the enamel organ and the surrounding mesenchymal cells play an important role in the later stages of tooth development. Each dental arch will have 10 tooth buds, accounting for 20 primary teeth.

=== Cap Stage ===
The cap stage occurs in week 9-10 i.u. Unequal proliferation of cells during this stage, invaginating into the ectomesenchyme tissue, leads to the formation of the cap-shaped enamel organ. The ectomesenchyme tissue also invaginates superficially to shape the primitive dental pulp. Differentiation of cells occurs at this stage to make different tissue layers; external enamel epithelium, stratum intermedium, stellate reticulum, internal enamel epithelium, dental papilla, and dental follicle. The external enamel epithelium, a layer of simple cuboidal epithelium, has a protective role during tooth development. The stellate reticulum, the innermost layer of the enamel organ, gathers GAGs between cells. The internal enamel epithelium will form enamel during the Bell Stage

=== Early Bell stage ===
There is uneven growth of enamel organ in this phase, and the epithelial cap deepens. The cap shape of the enamel organ assumes a bell shape as the undersurface of the cap deepens. Foldings of the internal enamel epithelium (done by the growing papilla cells) maps out the occlusal pattern of the tooth crown. The process is known as morphodifferentiation. The pressure exerted by the dental papilla cells has been shown to be opposed equally by the pressure from the fluid in the stellate reticulum (present in the enamel organ).

The folding of the enamel organ is caused by different rates of mitosis and difference in cell differentiation times, causing different crown shapes in each tooth.

=== Late Bell stage ===
This stage is the apposition stage (formation of dental hard tissues), also characterised by the commencement of root formation and mineralisation. The area between the internal enamel epithelium and odontoblasts outline the future dentinoenamel junction. Formation of dentine (dentinogenesis) precedes enamel formation (amelogenesis). It occurs first as along the future dentinoenamel junction in the region of future cusps and proceeds pulpally and apically. Cells of the internal enamel epithelium become pre-ameloblasts and release inductive factors which encourage the differentiation of odontoblasts from the mesenchymal cells of the dental papilla. This can be seen in the figure (marked A). The odontoblasts lay down dentine (see pale blue band). After the first layer of dentine is formed, this induces ameloblasts (B) to lay down enamel (red region) over the dentine in the future incisal and cuspal areas. Amelogenesis will then follow. The cervical portion of the enamel organ then gives rise to the Hertwig Epithelial Root Sheath (HERS)- this outlines the future root and also is responsible for the size, shape, length and the number of roots.

== Determination of crown morphology ==
The composition of the enamel organ does not vary greatly between incisors, canines, premolars, and molars. Although the quantity of odontoblasts, ameloblasts and cementoblasts present in premolars/molars and incisors/canines remains the same, the major difference between these morphological types of teeth is the rate of secretion and quantity of products secreted by the enamel organ (dentine, enamel, cementum). There has been no definite consensus as to what determines the differences between enamel organs in different teeth. However, it is a widely held view by dental professionals and biologists that genes and cell signaling between cells in the dental extracellular matrix/enamel matrix play a role.

The shape of the enamel layer covering the crown is determined by five growth parameters:

1. The appositional growth rate
2. Duration of appositional growth (at the cusp tip)
3. Ameloblast extension rate
4. Duration of ameloblast extension
5. Spreading rate of appositional termination.

The appositional growth mechanism establishes the thickness of the enamel layer and it is determined by ribbon-like carbonate apatite crystals which are present in the rods (or prisms) and interrods. They are produced by the ameloblast in the bell stage of tooth development. As the crystals are long and closely packed, the thickness depends on the abundance of the crystals in the tooth. Crown shape or morphology is determined by the epithelial-mesenchymal interaction, which occurs at the dentinoenamel junction (DEJ). Firstly, the pre-ameloblasts differentiate from the inner enamel epithelia on the dentine surface covering the pulp horn. A wave of ameloblasts will then differentiate from the cusp tip and move through the inner enamel epithelia down the slope of the mineralised dentine surface. The differentiation will extend down the slope of the dentine surface and reaches its limit, where the inner epithelium is fused with the outer enamel epithelium to form Hertwig's epithelial root sheath. Enamel mineral will increase daily (apposition growth) during the secretory stage of amelogenesis (enamel formation). Ultimately, the secretory stage will end and they will transition into maturation stage ameloblasts. These ameloblasts will move down to the enamel surface of the tooth and the shape of the crown and tooth is then established.

== Abnormalities ==
=== Odontomes ===
Odontomes are considered to be developmental anomalies resulting from the growth of completely differentiated epithelial and mesenchymal cells that give rise to ameloblasts and odontoblasts. Histologically, they are composed of different dental tissues including enamel, dentine, cementum and in some cases, pulp tissue, therefore if the enamel organ is not arranged in its proper fashion, an odontome may form. Odontomes are categorised as either:

Compound
this malformation is anatomically like a normal tooth, and has dental tissues (enamel, dentine, cementum) placed in an orderly fashion. These are more frequent than complex odontomes.
Complex
this malformation results in dental tissues being arranged in a disorderly fashion, forming an irregular mass.

Odontomes are rare entities and usually asymptomatic; they are often incidental findings on routine dental radiographic examinations. The complex odontome appears as an irregular mass of calcified material surrounded by a thin radiolucent area with smooth periphery, and the compound type shows calcified structures resembling teeth in the centre of a well-defined radiolucent lesion.

Some factors related to the development of odontomes are:

- Changes in genetic components responsible for tooth development
- Trauma at primary dentine period
- Inherited conditions such as Gardner's Syndrome
- Infection
- Inflammation
- Hyperactivity of odontoblasts.

The first reported case of an odontome erupting in the oral cavity was in 1980.

=== Dens Invaginatus ===
Dens Invaginatus is a dental anomaly which means that the affected tooth (dilated odontome) contains a cavity that is completely or partially lined by enamel, radiographically resembling a tooth within a tooth (dens in dente).

There is a lack of consensus on the aetiology of dens invaginatus. It is suggested that dens invaginatus arises because during odontogenesis, there is proliferation and ingrowth of the cells of the enamel organ into the dental papilla during development.

Another proposed theory is that the distortion of the enamel organ during tooth development and subsequent protrusion of a part of the enamel organ will lead to the formation of an enamel-lined channel ending at the cingulum or occasionally at the incisal tip.

Histologically, there are differences in the structure and composition between the external and internal enamel in dens invaginatus. The internal enamel exhibits atypical and more complex rod shapes and its surface has the typical honeycomb pattern but no perikymata.

The invagination can be:

- Coronal type: slight pitting involving the enamel organ infolding into the dental papilla
- Radicular type: occupying most of the crown and root involving invagination of Hertwig's epithelial root sheath, lined with cementum.

Dens invaginatus has a clinical importance as teeth affected with dens invaginatus are predisposed to developing pulpal disease. The invagination allows entry of irritants into an area which is separated from pulpal tissue by only a thin layer of enamel and dentine and extra preventative measures are advised to prevent dental caries.

=== Enamel Defect and Coeliac Disease ===
Coeliac disease in children is thought to be underdiagnosed because it may initially be asymptomatic. Studies have shown that enamel defect of permanent and deciduous or primary teeth may suggest the presence of undiagnosed coeliac disease in children and adults. Coeliac disease-related enamel defects are most commonly associated with incisors and first molar teeth, and are characterised by symmetrical distribution of enamel defects on the same tooth in all 4 quadrants. This is a distinct characteristic of enamel defects in coeliac disease that cannot be seen in other enamel defects.

Enamel defects in coeliac disease occur due to an interference in tooth formation by amelogenin. Amelogenin is a proline-rich enamel protein that plays a major role in mineralisation and organisation of tooth crystals. Disruption to this process cause alterations in the tooth surface. Patients with coeliac disease produce high levels of circulating IgG and IgA antigliadin antibodies (AGA) in order to get rid of protein gliadin, which is toxic to these patients. However, due to the structural similarities between amelogenin and gliadin, AGA may interfere with amelogenin which lead to improper formation of enamel. Furthermore, because IgG can be transported across the placenta, the amelogenesis process is disturbed from the intrauterine period to adolescence.

Gliadins are highly hydrophobic proteins in wheat gluten. The antibodies are produced to interact with this protein. Therefore, a gluten-free diet may lead to normalisation of tooth development as circulating antibodies for enamel defect may decrease.

== See also ==
- Ameloblast
- Tooth
- Tooth development
- Tooth enamel
