= Dental lamina =

Band of epithelial tissue

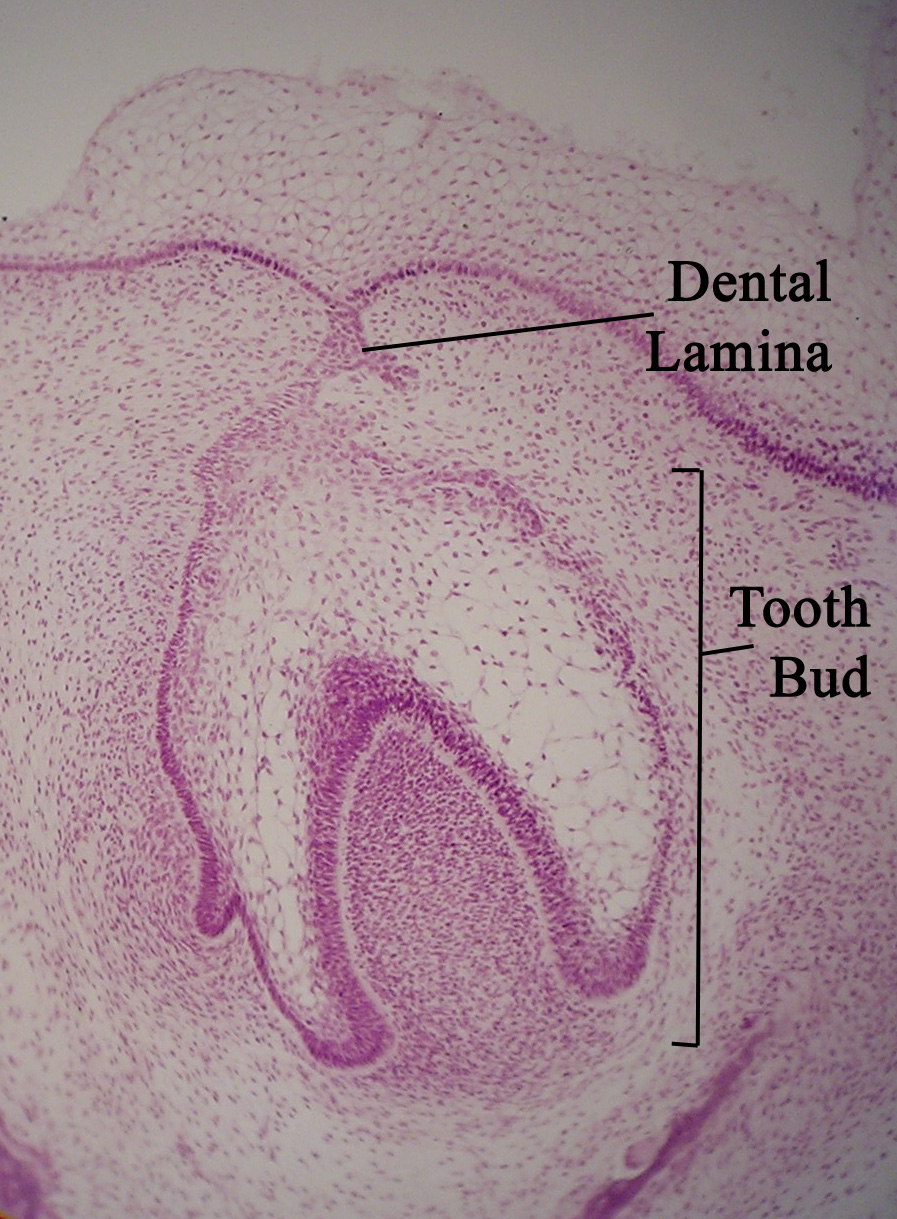
- Micrograph of a dental lamina and tooth bud. H&E stain.

Details

Identifiers
- Latin: lamina dentalis
- TE: lamina_by_E5.4.1.1.1.0.3 E5.4.1.1.1.0.3

The dental lamina is a band of epithelial tissue seen in histologic sections of a developing tooth. The dental lamina is first evidence of tooth development and begins (in humans) at the sixth week in utero or three weeks after the rupture of the buccopharyngeal membrane. It is formed when cells of the oral ectoderm proliferate faster than cells of other areas. Best described as an in-growth of oral ectoderm, the dental lamina is frequently distinguished from the vestibular lamina, which develops concurrently. This dividing tissue is surrounded by and, some would argue, stimulated by ectomesenchymal growth. When it is present, the dental lamina connects the developing tooth bud to the epithelium of the oral cavity. Eventually, the dental lamina disintegrates into small clusters of epithelium and is resorbed. In situations when the clusters are not resorbed, (this remnant of the dental lamina is sometimes known as the glands of Serres) eruption cysts are formed over the developing tooth and delay its eruption into the oral cavity. This invagination of ectodermal tissues is the progenitor to the later ameloblasts and enamel while the ectomesenchyme is responsible for the dental papilla and later odontoblasts.

== Function ==
Dental lamina plays a key role in a cascade of events that contributes to teeth development.

It derived from horseshoe shaped primary epithelial band which is formed when thickened oral epithelium invaginates into the mesenchyme.

A series of epithelial outgrowths deep into mesenchyme due to proliferation on the cranial portion of dental lamina give rise to future spot of deciduous teeth. Moreover, further proliferation on the leading edge of the lamina leads to permanent teeth development, as a result, successional lamina is formed when those permanent teeth succeed the 20 deciduous teeth. Since permanent molars do not have deciduous predecessor, they tend to develop from the general lamina which is also formed from dental lamina.

In addition, during the bell stage of tooth development, the dental lamina helps to disconnect the interaction between the oral epithelium and developing tooth by bringing the oral epithelium fragments and the tooth germs together. Breaking up of the dental lamina leads to the development of epithelial cell clusters, some of the clusters may remain instead of degenerate, those persisted clusters, called epithelial pearls, they can delay tooth eruption by creating a small cyst on the top of the developing tooth.

== Hyperactivity of Dental Lamina ==
Hyperactivity or overgrowth of dental lamina can give rise to conditions such as Hyperdontia. Having this condition means patients have supernumerary teeth - additional teeth other than 20 primary teeth in children and 32 permanent teeth in adults.

The reasons for this condition could be any of the following:

1. Dichotomy (division) of tooth buds.
2. Atavism
3. Gardner's syndrome
4. Hyperactivity of dental lamina.

The most acknowledged theory for supernumerary teeth is hyperactivity of dental lamina. On completion of the dentition, the dental lamina is usually destroyed and reabsorbed, but when remnants fail to resorb, it can continue to proliferate abnormally. This abnormal proliferation can form the extra tooth bud leading to supernumerary teeth.

== See also ==
- Diphyodont
- Polyphyodont
