= Inner enamel epithelium =

Precursor cells to ameloblasts in tooth development

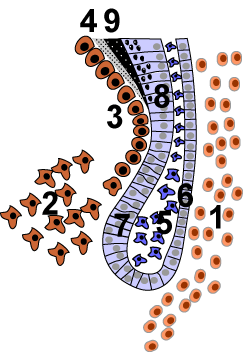
- The cervical loop area: (1) dental follicle cells, (2) dental mesenchyme, (3) odontoblasts, (4) dentin, (5) stellate reticulum, (6) outer enamel epithelium, (7) inner enamel epithelium, (8) ameloblasts, (9) enamel.

Details

Identifiers
- Latin: epithelium enameleum internum
- TE: enamel epithelium_by_E5.4.1.1.2.3.15 E5.4.1.1.2.3.15

In animal tooth development, the inner enamel epithelium, also known as the internal enamel epithelium, is a layer of columnar cells located on the rim nearest the dental papilla of the enamel organ in a developing tooth. This layer is first seen during the cap stage, in which these inner enamel epithelium cells are pre-ameloblast cells. These will differentiate into ameloblasts which are responsible for secretion of enamel during tooth development.

The location of the enamel organ where the outer and inner enamel epithelium join is called the cervical loop.
