= Animal tooth development =

Process by which teeth form and grow into the mouth

Time-lapse imaging of a developing tooth germ derived from a mouse embryo

Tooth development or odontogenesis is the process in which teeth develop and grow into the mouth. Tooth development varies among species.

== Tooth development in vertebrates ==
=== Fish ===
In fish, Hox gene expression regulates mechanisms for tooth initiation.

However, sharks continuously produce new teeth throughout their lives via a drastically different mechanism. Shark teeth form from modified scales near the tongue and move outward on the jaw in rows until they are eventually dislodged. Their scales, called dermal denticles, and teeth are homologous organs.

=== Mammals ===
Generally, tooth development in non-human mammals is similar to human tooth development. The variations usually lie in the morphology, number, development timeline, and types of teeth. However, some mammals' teeth do develop differently than humans'.

In mice, WNT signals are required for the initiation of tooth development. Rodents' teeth continually grow, forcing them to wear down their teeth by gnawing on various materials. If rodents are prevented from gnawing, their teeth eventually puncture the roofs of their mouths. In addition, rodent incisors consist of two halves, known as the crown and root analogues. The labial half is made of enamel and resembles a crown, while the lingual half is made of dentin and resembles a root. The mineral distribution in rodent enamel is different from that of monkeys, dogs, pigs, and humans.

In horse teeth, enamel and dentin layers are intertwined, which increases the strength and decreases the wear rate of the teeth. Contrary to popular belief, horse teeth do not "grow" indefinitely. Rather, existing tooth erupts from below the gumline. Horses start to "run out" of erupting tooth in their early 30s and in the rare case they live long enough, the roots of their teeth will fall out completely in the middle to latter part of their third decade.

In manatees, mandibular molars develop separately from the jaw and are encased in a bony shell separated by soft tissue. This also occurs in elephants' successional teeth, which erupt to replace worn teeth. Elephants have six sets of molars in their life, all of which grown from the back of their mouth and are then pushed forward.

All members of the order Tubulidentata have no incisors or canines, their teeth have no enamel, and their molars grow continuously from the root.

==== Human tooth development ====
When it comes to tooth development in humans, there are many differences in the way humans and other primates' teeth develop slowly over the beginning of their life. Once the dental tissue in primates and humans is formed, there are little changes made throughout the remainder of the organism's lifetime, but there are still factors such as tooth wear and dental disease can alter the dental tissue of primates. The dental tissue in primates is a layered structure, and scientists are able to observe the layered structure chronologically to learn about the detailed development of their teeth. This layered structure is preserved throughout life for humans and primates.

== Invertebrate "teeth" ==
True teeth are unique to vertebrates, although some invertebrates have analogous structures sometimes called "teeth". The organism with the simplest genome bearing such "teeth" is probably the worm genus Ancylostoma (Ancylostoma duodenale, Necator americanus). Molluscs have a structure called a radula which bears a ribbon of chitinous "teeth". However, these are histologically and developmentally different from vertebrate teeth, and are unlikely to be homologous. For example, vertebrate teeth develop from a neural crest mesenchyme-derived dental papilla, and the neural crest is specific to vertebrates, as are tissues such as enamel.

== Variation of tooth development across species ==
The study of tooth development across different species, invertebrates, and vertebrates indicates that tooth development varies greatly across different types of organisms. Organisms may vary from having few to no teeth at all to organisms that go through life with multiple layers of teeth. In some unique cases there are species with teeth that regenerate throughout their lifetime. Because of this, it is very important that scientists select specific species to study that may provide them with information as to how similar species' tooth development takes place. These organisms are chosen based on their specific early dental specification as well as tooth replacement ability. With an organism that has the ability to regenerate teeth, scientists have a unique opportunity to continuously study the specific odontogenic processes and mechanisms that lead to the development of teeth in different vertebrates.

== Genetics ==
In reptilian tooth development, some scientist have chosen to determine the location and function of the SHH gene as well as the odontogenic band to help collect information on how reptiles develop teeth at a young age. The SHH gene gives instructions to produce a protein known as the Sonic Hedgehog protein, and this protein's function is to aid in certain required embryonic development processes. The SHH gene and proteins play major roles in not only the tooth development of organisms, but they also help in cell growth, specialization, and patterning of an organism's body.

== See also ==
- Human tooth development
- Pharyngeal teeth
