= Mesowear =

Studies of an animal based on tooth wear

Mesowear is a method, used in different branches and fields of biology. This method can apply to both extant and extinct animals, according to the scope of the study. Mesowear is based on studying an animal's tooth wearing fingerprint. In brief, each animal has special feeding habits, which cause unique tooth wearing. Rough feeds cause serious tooth abrasion, while smooth one triggers moderate abrasion, so browsers have teeth with moderate abrasion and grazers have teeth with rough abrasion. Scoring systems can quantify tooth abrasion observations and ease comparisons between individuals.

== Mesowear definition ==
The mesowear method or tooth wear scoring method is a quick and inexpensive process of determining the lifelong diet of a taxon (grazer or browser) and was first introduced in the year 2000. The mesowear technique can be extended to extinct and also extant animals. Mesowear analyses require large sample populations (>20), which can be problematic for some localities, but the method yields an accurate depiction of an animal's average lifelong diet. Mesowear analysis is based on the physical properties of ungulate foods as reflected in the relative amounts of attritive and abrasive wear that they cause on the dental enamel of the occlusal surfaces. Mesowear was recorded by examining the buccal apices of molar tooth cusps. Apices were characterized as sharp, rounded, or blunt, and the valleys between them either high or low. The method has been developed only for selenodont and trilophodont molars, but the principle is readily extendable to other crown types. In collecting the data the teeth are inspected at close range, a hand lens will be used. Mesowear analysis is insensitive to wear stage as long as the very early and very late stages are excluded. Mesowear analysis follows standard protocols. Specimens are digitally photographed in labial view so that cusp shape and occlusal relief can be scored. This method helps zoologists and nutritionists to prepare proper kind of hay for captive feral herbivores with unknown feed habits in zoos. In collecting the data the teeth are inspected at close range, using a hand lens. Gravity toward lower teeth causes more abrasion on lower teeth than upper teeth. This fact is the base of mesowear method.

== Shape definition ==
Sharp: A sharp cusp terminates to a point and has practically no rounded area between the mesial and distal phase I facets,

Round: a rounded cusp has a distinctly rounded tip (apex) without planar facet wear but retains facets on the lower slopes.

Blunt: blunt cusp lacks distinct facets altogether.

mesowear variate

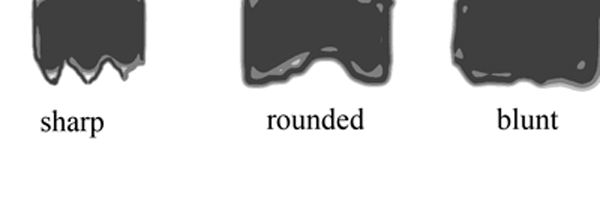
mesowear shape

== Terminology ==
The attrition: this kind of dental wearing is as a result of rubbing tooth to tooth and no external forces cause this enamel abrasion.usually browsers feed contains less food abrasive materials( such as silica because of feed selecting behavior in this animals so wearing type of browser ungulates will be this type in most cases.

The abrasion: rubbing food to tooth triggers this kind of tooth wearing more visible for grazer animals than browsers.

== Limitations ==
Mesowear is not ontogenetically stable among species with brachydont molars, and the usage of mesowear among such taxa needs to be adjusted for age of the animal.
