= Tanaka and Johnston analysis =

Mixed dentition analysis

Tanaka and Johnston analysis is a mixed dentition analysis which allows one to estimate the space available in an arch for the permanent teeth to erupt. This analysis was developed by Marvin M. Tanaka and Lysle E. Johnston in 1974 after they conducted a study on 506 orthodontic patients done in Cleveland at the Case Western Reserve University School of Dental Medicine.

== Technique ==
They believed that equations and size of the confidence intervals used by Moyer's Mixed Dentition Analysis have never been validated by any other studies. To predict the size of unerupted premolars and canines:

1/2 of Mesio-Distal width of four lower incisors + 10.5 = Estimated width of mandibular premolars + canine in one quadrant

1/2 of Mesio-Distal width of four lower incisors + 11.0 = Estimated width of maxillary premolars + canine in one quadrant

This analysis takes 3 measurements into account:

1. The Mesiodistal widths of the mandibular incisors
2. Predicted size of permanent canines and premolars and
3. The space available after the incisors are correctly aligned.
