= NCCL =

NCCL may refer to:

- National Council for Civil Liberties, a civil liberties organization in the UK
- Non-carious cervical lesions, a group of tooth lesions
- Nvidia Collective Communications Library, in computing
