= Midline =

Midline can refer to:

- Dental midline, in dentistry
- In mathematics:
  - bisector line
  - line of symmetry
  - median (geometry)
- Mean line, in typography
