= Dahl effect =

Dentistry concept

The Dahl effect or Dahl concept is used in dentistry where a localized appliance or localized restoration is used to increase the available interocclusal space for restorations.

== Concept ==
A steep incisal guidance angle (the angle formed between the sagittal plane when the incisors are in centric occlusion and the horizontal plane) must be reduced in order to decrease excessive horizontal forces on anterior teeth, which would lead to failure. The two methods used to reduce this are; to decrease the edge of the incisors and to increase the OVD (occlusal vertical dimension). The Dahl effect focuses on the latter of the two. Without increasing the OVD, needless restorative work of otherwise healthy teeth, would be required. Therefore, the Dahl concept is a more conservative technique to increase OVD.

The Dahl concept is the relative axial tooth movement that is observed when a localised appliance or localised restorations are placed in supra-occlusion and the occlusion re-establishes full arch contacts over a period of time. It involves the vertical tooth movement that occurs when anterior localised appliances/restorations are placed in supra occlusion causing the posterior teeth to disclude. Rather than restoring occlusion by means of restoration, it is allowed to re-establish over time through a combination of intrusion and over-eruption. This, in turn, will increase the OVD.

== History ==
The idea of creating interocclusal space was first proposed by D.J. Andersen in 1962. He introduced the concept of experimental malocclusion by inducing the over-eruption of teeth, placing restorations in the dentition in supra-occlusion. Anderson carried out a study on five human adult subjects aged 19–49 years; by placing a 0.5mm metal bite-raising cap on the occlusal surface of the subjects’ lower right first permanent molars, he found that each of the subjects were able to occlude their teeth after an experimental period of 23–41 days. He observed the changes in the distances of teeth in opposing arches using reference points on the capped tooth and its opponent, where he identified the introduction of an inter-occlusal space. It was not possible, however, to determine whether the creation of this space was due to the intrusion of the teeth in contact with the bite-raising cap or the eruption of the separated teeth due to the lack of fixed reference points.

In 1975, Bjørn L. Dahl from the Faculty of Dentistry of the University of Oslo became the first author through a series of papers to report the successful use of this technique for the management of the worn dentition. Along with Olaf Krogstad and Kjell Karlsen, Dahl described the use of a bite-raising appliance to increase the available interocclusal space available for future restorations. The removable appliance was originally cast in cobalt chromium and placed on the palatal aspects of an 18-year-old’s upper incisors which had been subject to localised attrition. Over a period of eight months, the appliance was worn 24 hours a day and over time enough space was created to allow the application of palatal gold inlays to the worn upper incisors. Dahl found that it was a combination of intrusion of the anterior teeth in contact with the appliance (40%) and passive eruption of the unopposed posterior teeth (60%) that permitted the reestablishment of posterior occlusion whilst maintaining the interocclusal space.

Adhesive dentistry can be used to achieve the same results today, as well as the use of provisional restorations in the treatment of anterior tooth surface loss.

== Clinical application ==
The Dahl concept is commonly used when an increase in the interocclusal space is required together with an increase in occlusal vertical dimension; for example when restoring a case of severe anterior tooth surface loss. Therefore, the main applications are for localised anterior wear caused by factors such as bulimia, GERD leading to severe dental erosion, resulting in insufficient interocclusal space for adequate restorations.

The apparent lack of inter-occlusal space presents a dilemma for the restorative dentist. Without the dahl concept, one main approach would be to further reduce the occlusal height of the already worn teeth. However, this would lead to a lack of axial height and thus insufficient retention and resistance for conventional extra-coronal restorations. Tooth preparation and the associated loss of coronal tissue can risk further insult to the pulp and limit the options for future restoration replacement. An alternative approach is to create the necessary space by reorganising the occlusion by means of an arbitrary increase of the vertical dimension of occlusion, i.e. the use of a dahl appliance. The creation of this interocclusal space will significantly reduce the amount of tooth preparation required, especially on the already compromised palatal surfaces of the maxillary anterior teeth.

Adaptation occurs over a period of some months: compensatory eruption of the posterior teeth will occur, together with some intrusion of the anterior teeth and potential growth of the alveolar bone. This will allow the posterior occlusion to reestablish at the new increased OVD, stabilizing the increased interocclusal space.

== Dahl appliance ==
The Dahl appliance is used to generate space between the upper and lower jaws. Traditionally this has been used in order to aid the placement of fillings on worn front teeth. Alterations to the teeth, from tooth wear or tooth loss, can lead to a decreased facial height due to physiological compensation that allows for maintenance of upper and lower teeth contact. The Dahl appliance can increase the height of a patient's face and correct for this loss of facial height.

The original Dahl appliance was a removable metal bite platform made with cobalt chromium. However, today many different materials can be used.

Placing Dahl composite resin appliance on worn down front teeth can separate and stimulate eruption of the back teeth. Once the back teeth contact, restorations can be placed on the front teeth without needing to remove excessive tooth structure to accommodate the restorations.

A Dahl appliance should fulfill the following aims:

- A thickness of material should be placed on the incisal or occlusal aspect of those teeth where the creation of interocclusal space is necessary. No mucosal-bone component should be involved
- Thickness of the material placed should directly correspond to the required amount of interocclusal space, which will determine the increase in OVD as measured at a specific site in the mouth.
- An occlusal bite platform should be constructed ideally to ensure the occlusal forces are directed along the long axis of teeth.
- Stable interocclusal contacts should be achieved.
- Movement of the discluded teeth should not be impeded by the appliance.

== Advantages ==
The advantages of this approach are:

- Minimal removal of tooth substance is required to create the interocclusal space; therefore, the technique involves limited destruction (this is particularly important on the palatal surfaces of anterior teeth where substantial wear may have occurred. This may be due to conditions causing intrinsic wear, such as bulimia and acid reflux. As time has gone on, even less invasive techniques have been used).
- Lost OVD can be restored by increasing the vertical dimension.
- Minimisation of facial aging by restoring facial height.
- Safety.
- Relative simplicity as it is easy to use and adjust.
- Relatively reversible.
- Relatively cost-effective approach.
- Today more aesthetic compared to Dahl’s original cobalt-chromium removable partial bite platform.
- Space creation occurs independent of age and sex.

== Limitations ==
The limitations of this approach are:

- Difficult to predict final occlusal contacts prior to treatment (dynamic process).
- Limited acceptance by GDPs internationally.
- Risk of plural symptoms (2% required root canal treatment following the procedure).
- Risk of periodontal problems (3-10% reported mild periodontal symptoms initially).
- Risk of mild to moderate muscle dysfunction.
- Risk of relapse.
- Reports of failure in patients lacking stable occlusal contacts in ICP or RCP.

== Success of Dahl concept ==
Planned occlusal changes can be tested using a removable appliance prior to permanent treatment. Dental composite based approaches to tooth surface loss allow for easy adjustment or removal if required. One study published in the British Dental Journal, 2011 found that patient satisfaction was high when composite restorations were used in the Dahl approach and that the median survival time was between 4.75 and 5.8 years.

== See also ==
- Tooth wear
