= Abrasion =

Abrasion may refer to:

- Abrasion (dental), the loss of tooth structure by mechanical forces from a foreign element
- Abrasion (medical), a wound consisting of superficial damage to the skin
- Abrasion (mechanical), the process of scuffing, scratching, wearing down, marring, or rubbing away
- Abrasion (geology), mechanical scraping of a surface by friction between moving particles

== See also ==
- Abrasion coast, a coastline that is characterised by the removal (abrasion) of material
- Abrasives
- Scarification (botany), alteration of a seed coat, sometimes by abrasion, to encourage germination
