= Rolf G. Behrents =

American orthodontist

Rolf Gordon "Buzz" Behrents is an American orthodontist.

Behrents graduated from St. Olaf College and earned his dental degree from Meharry Medical College School of Dentistry. Behrents received a master's degree from Case Western Reserve University in 1975, where he trained as an orthodontist. He taught at Case Western between 1978 and 1984, when he completed a doctorate in human growth and development at the University of Michigan. Behrents joined the University of Tennessee College of Dentistry soon after completing his Ph.D., remaining on the faculty until 1997. From 1998 to 2003, he taught at Baylor College of Dentistry. He then joined the Saint Louis University, and was named Lysle E. Johnston, Jr., Professor of Orthodontics. In 2014, Behrents was named chief editor of the American Journal of Orthodontics and Dentofacial Orthopedics.
