= Commission Regulation (EU) No. 1170/2011 =

Regulation (EU) No. 110/2011
- European Union regulation
- Text with EEA relevance
- Made by: European Commission
- Journal reference: L299, pp. 1-3

History
- Date made: 2011-11-16

Commission Regulation (EU) No. 1170/2011 of 16 November 2011 refusing to authorise certain health claims made on foods and referring to the reduction of disease risk is a European Union regulation addressing permissible nutritional and health claims made on foods sold in the EU. It includes two opinions:

- It prohibits food business operators from claiming that "regular consumption of significant amounts of water can reduce the risk of development of dehydration and of concomitant decrease of performance."
- It prohibits the claim that consumption of calcium-containing fruit juices can reduce the risk of dental erosion.
