= Robert Moyers =

Robert Edison Moyers (November 12, 1919 – January 8, 1996) was an American orthodontist who was the founder of the Center of Human Growth and Development (CHGD) at University of Michigan and chair of its orthodontic program for 28 years. He made significant contributions towards orthodontics through the development of CHGD and interdisciplinary research involving craniofacial biology. He is credited for developing the Moyer's Mixed Dentition Analysis.

== Life ==
He was born in Sidney, Iowa, among three other siblings and spent majority of his early childhood there. He moved to Iowa City in 1937, to start his college education at State University of Iowa. He also went to University of Iowa College of Dentistry and received his dental degree from there. During his time in college and dental school, he served at a small church as a pastor for eight years. After his graduation from dental school in 1942, Moyers joined the army in World War II. He was the senior Allied medical liaison officer at the resistance movement happening in Greece at that time. In 1945, he was discharged from the army and received many accolades. Among them were Bronze Star, Legion of Merit, Purple Heart, Order of the British Empire and Order of Phoenix. He returned after the war and received his Orthodontic Certificate from University of Iowa. He also earned his doctorate in physiology from the same university.

He was married to Barbara Quick Moyers and had two daughters.

== Career ==
- In 1948, he started his career by becoming chairman of Department of Orthodontics at the University of Toronto.
- In 1952, he became the chair of Michigan's orthodontic program.
- In 1964, he founded the Center of Human Growth and Development at University of Michigan. This center was established after the initiative taken by the University of Michigan to develop a research unit which involved many disciplines.
- In 1980, he stepped down as the director of the center.
- In 1990, he retired and became professor emeritus of dentistry and also a fellow emeritus of the center.
- In 1974, the University of Michigan decided to establish Moyers Symposium in honor of Moyers. This symposium was designed to discuss recent evidence in new approaches in the field of orthodontics.

He is known to have authored the textbook Handbook of Orthodontics and participated in co-authoring or editing another 15 books. He died at the age of 75 in 1996.

== Awards ==
- Albert H. Ketcham Award – highest award given in speciality of orthodontics, 1988
- Member of Royal College of Surgeons of England, 1955

== See also ==
- Dentition analysis
