= Pont's analysis =

Pont's analysis is an analysis developed by A. Pont in 1909. This analysis allows one to predict the width of the maxillary arch at the premolar and molar region by measure the mesio-distal widths of the four permanent incisors. The analysis helps to determine if the dental arch is narrow or normal and if expansion is possible or not.

The width from Left Premolar to Right Premolar or Measured Premolar Value (MPV) can be calculated by using Sum of Incisal Widths (S.I) of incisors and multiplying it by 100. The result can be divided by 80.

The width from Left Molar to Right Molar or Measured Molar Value (MMV) can be calculated by using the S.I of incisors and multiplying by 100. The result is divided by 64.

The widths are measured from occlusal grooves of both premolars and molars.

== Disadvantages ==
One of the drawbacks of this analysis is that the analysis was initially done on French Population by Pont. Therefore, the data cannot be used to make predictions for other populations. This analysis also does not take the alignment of the teeth into consideration. In addition, because this analysis only applies to the upper arch serves a drawback also. Maxillary teeth are often missing and Peg Laterals are often seen in the maxillary arch.

== Linder Harth Index ==
Linder Hath index is derived from Pont's Index. The Hath index has a slight variation from Pont's analysis. In the maxillary arch instead of 80, Linder Harth Index uses 85 to achieve the Measured Molar Value.

== See also ==
- Dentition Analysis
