= Non-carious cervical lesions =

Dental condition

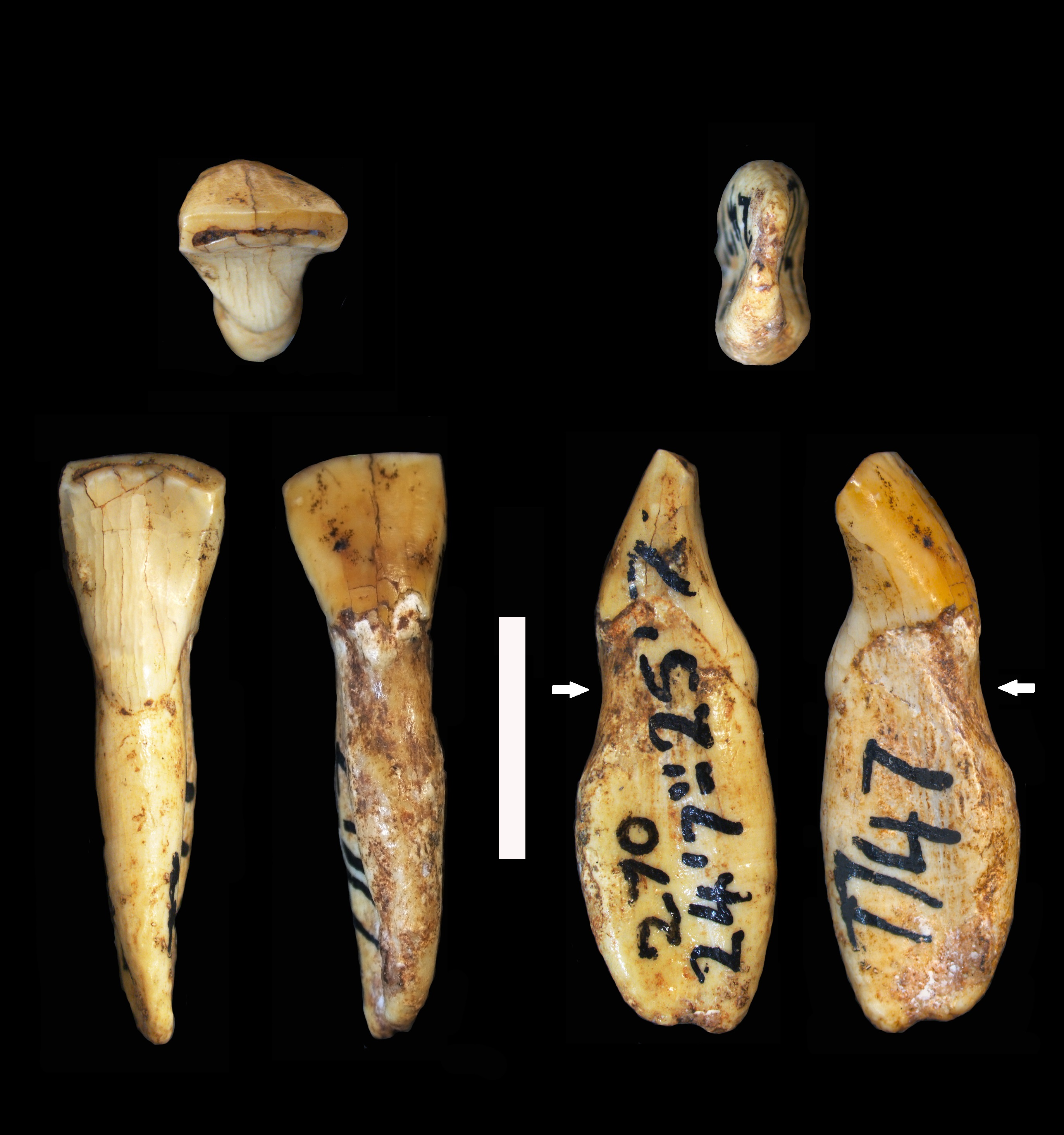
Non-carious cervical lesions on an incisor belonging to Australopithecus africanus. Arrows show the location of the lesions.

Non-carious cervical lesions (NCCLs) are a group of lesions that are characterised by a loss of hard dental tissue at the cementoenamel junction (CEJ) region at the neck of the tooth, without the action of microorganisms or inflammatory processes. These lesions vary in shape from regular depressions that look like a dome or a cup, to deep wedge-shaped defects with the apex pointing inwards. NCCLs can occur either above or below the level of the gum, at any of the surfaces of the teeth.

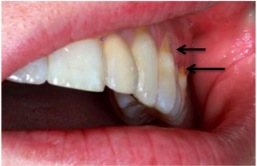
An example of non-carious cervical lesions.

== Aetiology ==
NCCL is a complex multifactorial condition and it is believed that multiple factors contribute to the formation of such lesions. Traditionally, the believed aetiological causes for NCCL have been erosion and abrasion. However, in the past few decades, abfraction has been implicated as a possible contributing factor of NCCLs as well. Bartlett and Shah propose that NCCLs arise from a combination of all three factors: erosion, abrasion and possibly abfraction as well. While the role of erosion and abrasion in NCCLs is well proven, more research still needs to be done to prove the abfraction theory.

=== Erosion and Abrasion ===
Erosion is the “non-bacterial loss of tooth substance due to chemical agents” with the most common form being acids. There are two form of acids that contribute to erosive tooth wear: intrinsic and extrinsic. Intrinsic acids are from vomiting and regurgitation. Individuals suffering from medical conditions associated with vomiting and regurgitation such as gastroesophageal reflux (GERD), bulimia nervosa, chronic alcoholism, and hyperemesis gravidum in pregnancy are hence at higher risk of developing erosive NCCLs. On the other hand, extrinsic acids include dietary acids in soft drinks, sports energy drinks, fruit juices, chewable vitamin C tablets, sweet-sour candies, herbal teas, dry wine and vinegar-containing foods.

Abrasion is defined as the “non-bacterial loss of tooth tissue due to frictional wear by extrinsic agents”. It is well documented in literature that erosion and abrasion act together in vivo to create NCCLs. Abrasion is believed to arise from toothbrushing, due to the tooth surface coming into contact with “hard abrasive particles in the toothpaste”. Acids within the mouth soften and weaken the cervical tooth surface, making the tooth surface susceptible to the effects of abrasion, leading to the formation of NCCLs. This usually arises when patients brush their teeth after a meal of fruits or fruit juices.

=== Abfraction ===
In the last twenty years, an alternative hypothesis has been proposed for the formation of NCCLs. Numerous studies have suggested that abfraction, a term coined by Grippo might contribute to the formation of NCCLs. Abfraction has been reported to be the loss of tooth substance due to the “biomechanical loading forces that result in flexure and failure” of tooth structure “at a location away from the loading”. Numerous studies have suggested that occlusal loading results in the deformation and flexure of the tooth, creating a large amount of stress in the cervical region of the tooth. The persistent stress exerted on the tooth surface creates microfractures on the tooth structure, resulting in tooth breakdown and hence formation of NCCLs.

However, despite many literature reviews supporting abfraction as a contributing factor to the formation of NCCLs, one key clinical finding has significantly put into question the evidence used to support the abfraction theory. The evidence used to back the abfraction theory were primarily obtained from finite element analyses. The finite element studies conducted suggest that based on the abfraction theory, lingual surfaces of teeth should be equally susceptible to cervical wear as the buccal surfaces. However clinical findings reveal lingual NCCLs are much rarer than buccal NCCLs, this means that there is little clinical evidence showing the causal relationship between occlusal stress and NCCLs. More research on this subject matter has to be conducted before the abfraction theory can be recognised as a cause of NCCLs.

== Archaeological non-carious cervical lesions ==
When NCCLs are present in archaeological samples they can provide insight into behaviour and diet. Abrasion is the most common mechanism of NCCLs observed in archaeological samples, and results from non-masticatory contact of an object with teeth, often through cultural or therapeutic behaviour. Most NCCLs in archaeological examples are attributed to abrasion, with ‘toothpick grooves’ particularly common. Less commonly acid erosion can cause NCCLs, and is caused by the chemical dissolution of dental tissues by acids of non-bacterial origin, most commonly low pH diets. Abfraction, is almost never seen in the pre-modern samples, leading some researchers to suggest it is a uniquely modern issue caused by recent dietary and behavioural changes.

== Epidemiology ==
There is wide variation in the reported worldwide prevalence rates of NCCLs. According to the literature, the NCCL prevalence ranges from 9.1% to 93% in adults aged 16–75 years. The worldwide weighted average prevalence of NCCLs among adults is 46.7%. When geographical regions are compared, South America has the highest reported prevalence of NCCLs, whilst the United States has the lowest. Studies show a tendency for prevalence to increase with age. The older the population studied, the greater the percentage of lesions found, the greater the number of lesions per individual and the larger the lesions. Many studies also show a link between good oral hygiene and a higher frequency of NCCLs. People who brush twice daily have a statistically significant higher prevalence of NCCLs than those who brush less frequently.

== Diagnosis ==
Due to the multi-factorial aetiology of NCCL, a comprehensive medical and dental history is imperative in ensuring an accurate clinical diagnosis. This includes obtaining information about the patient's diet, social history, lifestyle and brushing habits.

A systematic review by Teixeira et al. reported that most diagnoses of NCCL are derived from a combination of visual and tactile clinical examinations under adequate illumination. This is depicted as a clinical loss of mineralized dental tissue at the cementoenamel junction (CEJ) in the buccal or lingual dental surfaces. There is also a consensus that visual dentine exposure is a reliable indicator of loss of tooth tissue.

=== Diagnostic Criteria ===
Aw TC et al. summarizes the diagnostic clinical characteristics of NCCLs based on an in vivo investigation carried out on 57 patients and 171 teeth. These are described in the table below:

Characteristic	Description
Shape	Saucer or wedged shape, at right-angles
Size	1- 2mm depth and width
Extent of Sclerosis	Sclerotic dentine present
Sensitivity	No or mild sensitivity to air and pressure from exploratory probe
Occlusion	Class I occlusion, group function, visible wear facets and no mobility in teeth
Demographic Information	Mainly affects patients in their old age, no specific gender differences, or patterns

The Smith and Knight Tooth Wear Index (1984) can be used in combination with visual and tactile examination to grade extent of tooth wear. It seeks to monitor and measure all types of tooth wear, regardless of how it occurred. Furthermore, it measures acceptable and pathological levels of wear by putting the results against threshold normal values of the particular age group studied.

Teixeira et al.’s systematic review highlights that 19 out of 24 studies used visual and tactile examination as diagnostic assessment while 4 studies conducted in Asia used the Smith and Knight Index.

After an initial diagnosis has been established, monitoring through intra-oral photographs, study casts, and tooth wear indices should be done regularly before formulating a definite diagnosis and appropriate management.

== Treatment ==
In order for NCCLs to be treated effectively and to ensure longevity, the cause of the lesion should be deduced and this factor eliminated. Otherwise the treatment may be limited to only palliative care involving monitoring and efforts to minimise growth of the lesion. Primary indications for intervention in NCCLs include: poor aesthetics, dentine hypersensitivity and food stagnation. There may also be a requirement for treatment if the lesion affects the design of a partial denture.

Treatment of NCCLs to relieve symptoms of dentine hypersensitivity involve either chemical or physical occlusion of the dentinal tubules.

Direct resin composite restorations are used commonly in dentistry and are effective in treating aesthetic issues as they are tooth coloured. The success of a resin composite restoration does not rely greatly on traditional tooth preparation involving mechanical retention from the cavity. Instead adhesion to tooth structure is utilised. This makes composite resin the treatment option of choice in the case of NCCLs as the lesions offer minimal retention or resistance form naturally and would require further tissue removal for this to be achieved. Choosing resin composite to treat NCCLs protects the teeth from further loss of healthy tooth structure.

NCCLs are located mainly in dentine and most adhesive processes rely on adhesion to enamel. Sclerotic dentine compromises the restoration as it is difficult to bond composite resin to this type of tissue. This has led to discussions around tooth surface treatments of NCCLs prior to the restoration being placed. Surface irrigation with EDTA works to remove the smear layer from the cavity to allow bonding of the restoration. Studies have shown that application of the adhesive with a frictional technique has also increased adhesion.

Treatment of NCCLs can also be carried out with glass ionomer.
