= Cathetometer =

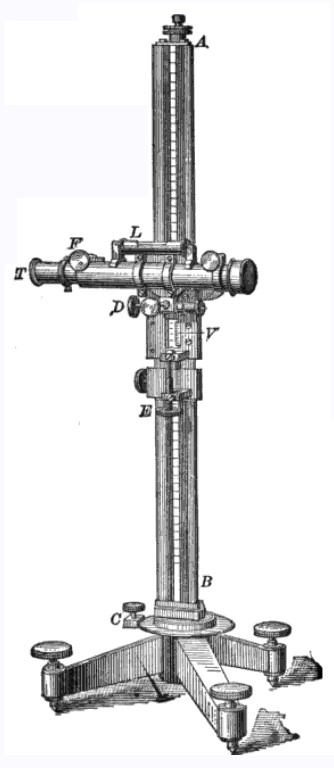
A cathetometer

A cathetometer is an instrument for measuring vertical distances in cases where a scale cannot be placed very close to the points whose distance apart is desired.

The instrument consists essentially of an accurately graduated scale and a horizontal telescope capable of being moved up and down a rigid vertical column. The position of the telescope can be read by means of an attached Vernier scale. In measuring the vertical distance between two points, the instrument must first be leveled. Next, the cross hair in the eyepiece of the horizontal telescope is brought into coincidence with the image of one point and the position of the telescope noted; the cross hair is then brought into coincidence with the image of the other point and the new position of the telescope noted. The difference between these readings is the vertical distance required.

Among the uses of a cathetometer is reading the levels of a liquid in a capillary tube, such as in measurements of surface tension. A cathetometer also can be used for following the changes in liquid level in a dilatometer due to, for example, a chemical reaction therein.

== See also ==
- Travelling microscope
