= Bolton analysis =

Tooth analysis

Bolton Analysis is a tooth analysis developed by Wayne A. Bolton to determine the discrepancy between size of maxillary and mandibular teeth. This analysis helps to determine the optimum interarch relationship. This analysis measures the Mesio-distal width of each tooth and is divided into two analyses.

== History ==
Wayne A Bolton presented this analysis in the year 1958. In 1962, he published another paper which talked about clinical applications of using Bolton Analysis in Orthodontics. He graduated from The University Of Washington Dental School in 1950. A bole gauge is usually the instrument of choice to measure the widths of each teeth. However, in 1995, Shellhart et al. showed during their study that Vernier caliper can also be used as an alternative for Bolton Analysis. Many other investigation models have been developed, such as measurement from photocopies and traveling microscope but the studies have produced no results.

Recently, digital calipers from companies such as OrthoCad, are being used to measure the mesiodistal widths of the teeth.

== Analysis ==
An Overall Analysis measures the sum of mesio-distal width of all 12 (first molar to first molar) mandibular teeth and compares them to the 12 maxillary teeth. The overall ratio known to be 91.3%. The anterior analysis measures the sum of Mesio-distal width of front 6 mandibular teeth and compares them to maxillary teeth. The anterior ratio is known to be 77.2%. An overall ratio of more than 91.3% means that the mandibular teeth are bigger when compared to normal. A ratio smaller than 91.3% would mean the mandibular teeth are smaller than normal. Anterior analysis follows the same principle. Having a different ratio than normal is referred to as Bolton Discrepancy. A standard deviation of more than 2 yields a significant discrepancy.

== Drawbacks ==
One of the drawbacks of this analysis, is that the sample that Bolton measured in his paper in 1958, consisted of only Caucasian population. Therefore, Bolton's Overall Ratio and Anterior Ratio Mean and Standard Deviations are not representative of samples from other race and population. In addition, because the samples that were measured had perfect malocclusion, any samples after performing Bolton Analysis, will yield a high discrepancy compared to Bolton ratios. It is seen that majority of the populations when studied and compared to Bolton's ratios, are usually not ideal compared to his ratios.
