= Little's irregularity index =

Measure of tooth alignment in dentistry

Little's irregularity index is an index used in the field of orthodontics to measure the crowding of the mandibular anterior arch. The index was first proposed by Robert M. Little in 1975 in his paper "The Irregularity Index: A quantitative score of mandibular anterior alignment".

The index takes the anatomical contact points of anterior incisors into account. A contact point is created by touching of edges of two different teeth. During mandibular crowding, teeth are often rotated or displaced either palatally or buccally. Little's irregularity index measures the horizontal linear displacement of anatomic contact points of each mandibular incisor from the adjacent anatomic point and sums the five displacement together. Once summed, the value represents the degree of anterior irregularity.

A perfect alignment from canine to canine will yield a score of 0 on the index. As the crowding increases, the score will increase. Little used dial calipers in his study to measure the distances on a plaster model taken of mandibular arches. The caliper had an accuracy to tenths of millimeter. The vertical discrepancy between the contact points does not play a role in the index. The scale of the index is listed below. The number corresponds to the distance in millimeters of the sum of horizontal displacements of the anatomical contact points of the mandibular anterior teeth.

- 0 - Perfect alignment
- 1-3 - Minimal irregularity
- 4-6 - Moderate irregularity
- 7-9 - Severe irregularity
- 10 - Very severe irregularity

== Disadvantages ==
Some of the disadvantages of this index includes assigning high score to Malocclusion which involve a severe rotation of one or more tooth. The treatment of a case like this may be simple compared to the high score of crowding it received from this index. The index also does not take into account other features of malocclusion before assigning a score to an individual.

== See also ==
- Dentition analysis
