= Dental midline =

Line running centrally between teeth

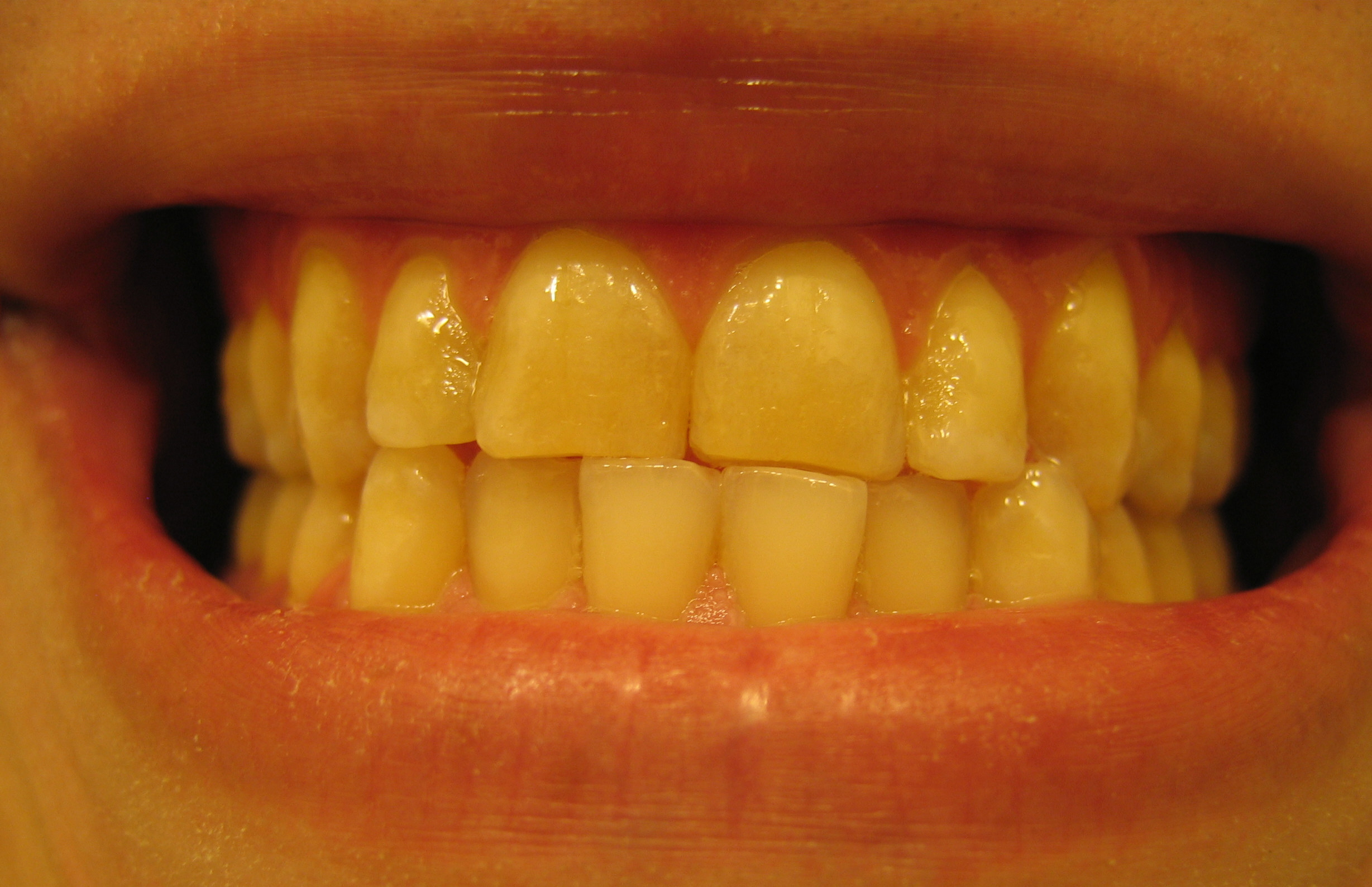
A profile of a smile, exhibiting a deviated dental midline about 2 mm to the left (the midline is measured as the mandible in relation to the maxilla. Even though the teeth are in an edge-to-edge position, the teeth are in maximum intercuspation; this patient possesses a Class III occlusion.

In this diagram of the universal numbering system, the midline can be visualized as running from the 8-9 area to the 24-25 area.

The dental midline is the midsagittal line of maxillary and mandibular dental arches possessing teeth of ideal size, shape, and position, when situated in maximum intercuspation. Each arch also possesses its own midline, which can be used to refer to the location of contact between the mesial surfaces of the central incisors. Thus, if an individual's mandibular teeth are shifted over to the left in a mesial-distal dimension, by 2 mm, for example, that individual's midline would be said to be deviated 2 mm to the left.
