= Moyer's mixed dentition analysis =

Moyer's mixed dentition analysis was created in 1971 by Robert Moyers . This is an analysis used in dentistry to predict the size of the permanent premolars and canines by measuring the width of the permanent incisors. The analysis usually requires a dental cast, Boley's gauge, and a Probability Chart.

== Procedure ==
Following are the steps used in this analysis

1. Measure widths of each of four permanent incisors of the lower jaw (mandibular central incisor and mandibular lateral incisor).
2. The total Mesio-Distal width of the incisors is calculated
3. A prediction chart is used for space available in each arch, and the value that matches closest to the sum of incisors is picked.

== Advantages/Disadvantages ==
Some of the advantages of this analysis are that it has minimum systemic errors, easy to perform by both beginners and expert dentists, it can be used for both the arches, can be performed on both casts or in mouth, and does not require any radiographic projections. Limitations of this analysis are that this is a probability analysis, does not account for tipping of incisors lingual or buccal and that maxillary tooth sizes are predicted by the mandibular tooth sizes. Other limitations of this analysis is that Moyers never clarified which population this analysis was done on initially. Therefore, this analysis cannot be truly applied to different populations. This was confirmed by a systematic review which was performed in 2004.

== See also ==
- Dentition Analysis
