= Dental abrasion =

Abrasion (dental)
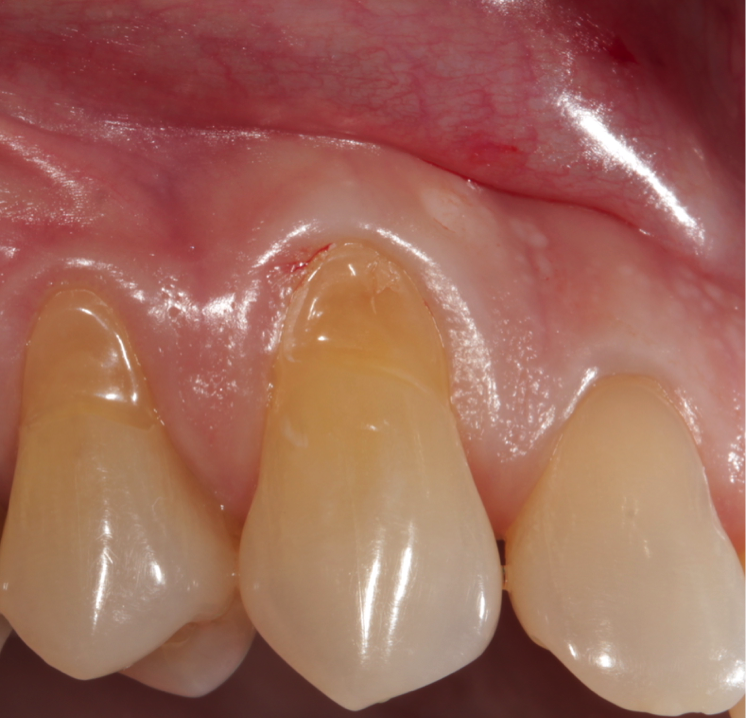
- Dental abrasion
- Specialty: Dentistry

Abrasion is the non-carious, mechanical wear of tooth from interaction with objects other than tooth-tooth contact. It most commonly affects the premolars and canines, usually along the cervical margins. Based on clinical surveys, studies have shown that abrasion is the most common but not the sole aetiological factor for development of non-carious cervical lesions (NCCL) and is most frequently caused by incorrect toothbrushing technique.

Abrasion frequently presents at the cemento-enamel junction and can be caused by many contributing factors, all with the ability to affect the tooth surface in varying degrees.

The appearance may vary depending on the cause of abrasion, however most commonly presents in a V-shaped caused by excessive lateral pressure whilst tooth-brushing. The surface is shiny rather than carious, and sometimes the ridge is deep enough to see the pulp chamber within the tooth itself.

Non-carious cervical loss due to abrasion may lead to consequences and symptoms such as increased tooth sensitivity to hot and cold, increased plaque trapping which will result in caries and periodontal disease, and difficulty of dental appliances such as retainers or dentures engaging the tooth. It may also be aesthetically unpleasant to some people.

For successful treatment of abrasion, the cause first needs to be identified and ceased (e.g. overzealous brushing). Once this has occurred, subsequent treatment may involve the changes in oral hygiene, application of fluoride to reduce sensitivity, or the placement of a restoration to help prevent further loss of tooth structure and aid plaque control.

== Cause ==
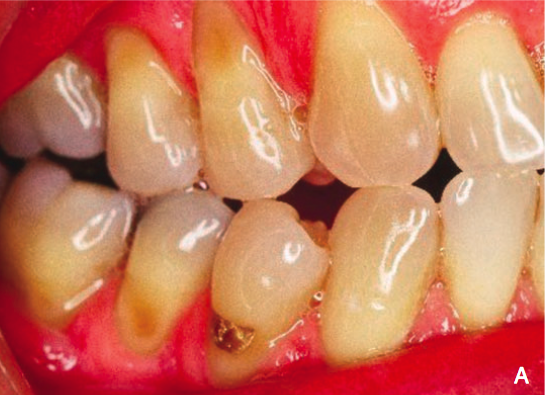
Abrasion occurring on the cervical margins from the effects of friction from toothbrushing and abrasive toothpastes

Cause of abrasion may arise from interaction of teeth with other objects such as toothbrushes, toothpicks, floss, and ill-fitting dental appliance like retainers and dentures. Apart from that, people with habits such as nail biting, chewing tobacco, lip or tongue piercing, and having occupation such as joiner, are subjected to higher risks of abrasion.

The aetiology of dental abrasion can be due to a single stimulus or, as in most cases, multi-factorial. The most common cause of dental abrasion is the combination of mechanical and chemical wear.

Tooth brushing is the most common cause of dental abrasion, which is found to develop along the gingival margin, due to vigorous brushing in this area. The type of toothbrush, the technique used and the force applied when brushing can influence the occurrence and severity of resulting abrasion. Further, brushing for extended periods of time (exceeding 2-3 min) in some cases, when combined with medium/hard bristled toothbrushes can cause abrasive lesions. Abrasion may also be exacerbated by overzealous use of certain types of dentifrice; some have more abrasive qualities to remove stains such as whitening toothpastes.

The bristles combined with forceful brushing techniques applied can roughen the tooth surface and cause abrasion as well as aggravating the gums. Repetitive irritation to the gingival margin can eventually cause recession of the gums. When the gums recede, the root surface is exposed which is more susceptible to abrasion. Comparatively, electric toothbrushes have less abrasive tendencies.

When combined with incorrect brushing technique, toothpastes can also damage enamel and dentine due to the abrasive properties. Specific ingredients are used in toothpaste to target removal of the bio-film and extrinsic staining however in some cases can contribute to the pastes being abrasive. In-home and clinical whitening have been proven to increase the likelihood of an individual experiencing dental abrasion. It is believed that dental abrasion due to the whitening process is caused by a combination of both mechanical and chemical irritants, for example, using whitening toothpaste and at home bleaching kits together. However, if an individual is regimented in their after-whitening care then they can avoid loss of tooth structure and in turn abrasion can be avoided.

Another factor that can contribute to abrasive loss of tooth structure is the alteration of pH levels at the tooth surface. This can associated with the consumption of acidic foods and liquids or regurgitation of stomach acid, a process known as dental erosion. An increase in acidity at the tooth surface can induce demineralization and softening, therefore leaving the tooth structure susceptible to abrasive factors such as tooth brushing. When the surface of the tooth structure is softened by acid, mechanical forces such as brushing can cause irreparable damage on tooth surface. Remineralization of the softened surface can help prevent this damage from occurring.

== Relative dentin abrasivity ==
Relative dentin abrasivity (RDA) is a standardised measurement of the abrasive effect that the components of a toothpaste have.

The RDA scale was developed by the American Dental Association (ADA), government bodies and other stakeholders to quantify the abrasivity of a toothpaste. It was not designed to rank safety of toothpastes, and all toothpastes with an RDA of 250 or less are considered to be equally safe for regular use in terms of abrasivity. The RDA scale compares toothpaste abrasivity to standard abrasive materials and measures the depth of cut at an average of 1 millimetre per 100,000 brush strokes onto dentine. This comparison generates abrasive values for the dentifrices that would be safe for daily use.

Since 1998, the RDA value is set by the standards DIN EN ISO 11609. Currently, the claim on products such as toothpaste are not regulated by law, however a dentifrice is required to have a level lower than 250 to be considered safe and before being given the ADA seal of approval. The vast majority of toothpastes commercially available have RDA values of 250 or less and are unlikely to have a significant impact on abrasion of tooth structure over a lifetime of use. On average, data suggests less than 400 μm of tooth wear occurs over a lifetime using toothpastes of RDA 250 or less.

The RDA score of a toothpaste is not the primary factor to consider when managing and preventing dental abrasion. Other factors such as the amount of pressure used whilst brushing, the type, thickness and dispersion of bristle in the toothbrush and the time spent brushing are significant factors that contribute to the risk of dental abrasion.

== Treatment ==
There are several reasons to treat abrasion lesion(s) (also known as 'Class V cavity') such as:

1. Sensitivity.
2. Presence of carious lesion.
3. Aesthetically unpleasant.
4. Arresting the progression of the lesion.
5. Reducing potential onset of caries or periodontal disease as these lesions can present as a plaque retention factor.
6. Where there is a risk of pulpal exposure if lesion depth is severe enough.
7. When retention of a removable appliance is interfered, i.e. denture
8. To improve denture clasp(s) retention.
9. Overall integrity of tooth structure is compromised.

In order for successful treatment of abrasion to occur, the aetiology first needs to be identified. The most accurate way of doing so is completing a thorough medical, dental, social and diet history. All aspects need to be investigated as in many cases the cause of abrasion can be multi-factorial. Once a definitive diagnosis is completed the appropriate treatment can commence. Treatment for abrasion can present in varying difficulties depending on the current degree or progress caused by the abrasion. Abrasion often presents in conjunction with other dental conditions such as attrition, decay and erosion. Evidence suggest there is a decrease in the effect of dental abrasion with dental erosion when fluoride varnish is applied onto teeth. Successful treatment focuses on the prevention and progression on the condition and modifies the current habit/s instigating the condition.

=== Removal of causes ===
If the cause of abrasion is due to habitual behaviours, the discontinuation and change of habit is critical in the prevention of further tooth loss. The correct brushing technique is pivotal and involves a gentle scrub technique with small horizontal movements with an extra-soft/soft bristle brush. Excessive lateral force can be corrected by holding the toothbrush in a pen grasp or by using the non-dominant hand to brush. If abrasion is the result of an ill-fitting dental appliance, this should be corrected or replaced by a dental practitioner and should not be attempted in a home setting.

=== Chemical ===
The current selection of dentifrice should also be critically analysed and changed to include a less abrasive and gentler paste such as sensitive toothpaste as evidence suggests that a very abrasive toothpaste would lead to loss of tooth structure. A toothpaste containing increased fluoride will also help combat the increased sensitivity and risk to dental decay. Toothpastes containing stannous fluoride have been shown to inhibit acid erosion of tooth structure, thereby reducing its susceptibility to abrasive wear. Fluoride varnish can also be used as a preventive measure for patients at high risk of dental erosion, as the fluoride varnish increases resistance to erosion and subsequent tooth wear.

Treatment in the dental chair may include a fluoride application or the placement of a restoration in more severe cases. If the lesion is small and confined to enamel or cementum, a restoration is not warranted, instead the eradication of rough edges should occur to reduce plaque retentive properties. However, in the case of dental decay, aesthetic concerns or defects close to the pulp a restoration may be completed. Further restorative work may be required when the lesion compromises the overall strength of the tooth or when the defect contributes to a periodontal problem the lesion may be restored.

Once abrasive lesions have been diagnosed and treated they should be closely monitored to identify further progression or potential relief of symptoms.

=== Restoration ===
Ideal properties of restoration materials particularly for these lesions include:

1. Satisfactory wear resistance most commonly caused by overzealous/excessive force used during toothbrushing.
2. Low modulus of elasticity, given that teeth (anterior dentition) have been considered to flex around the cervical area (area closest to gum levels).
3. Good aesthetics.

There are other properties of restoration materials which could be considered appropriate, although not specific to Class V restorations, which includes:

1. Small filler particles for polishability to achieve better aesthetics.
2. Sufficiently stiff consistency to hold shape but still allows easy handling for placement into a cavity.
3. Self-curing/setting or curable to any depth.
4. Dimensionally stable or low shrinkage/stress.
5. Fluoride release.
6. Self-adhesive to enamel and dentine.

Dental materials such as amalgam, glass ionomer (GI), resin-modified glass ionomer (a variant of GI) and resin composite are the types of restoration materials available when active treatment by means of restoration is appropriate.

Taking into consideration these factors and their respective dental materials' properties, evidence and studies has shown that resin-modified glass ionomer (RMGI) restoration material is the recommended restoration material in clinical situations as it performs optimally - provided aesthetics is not the top priority when restoring these lesions. The surface of such lesions should be roughened prior to its restoration - whether material is GI-based or resin-based - with no need for bevelling of the coronal aspect of the cavity.

== See also ==
- Tooth wear
- Attrition
- Erosion
- Abfraction
- Bruxism
- Air abrasion
