= Dentition analysis =

Dentition analyses are systems of tooth and jaw measurement used in orthodontics to understand arch space and predict any malocclusion (mal-alignment of the teeth and the bite). Example systems of dentition analysis are listed below.

== Permanent dentition (adult teeth) analysis ==
- Maxillary dentition (upper teeth)
  - Pont's Analysis
  - Linder Harth Index
  - Korkhaus Analysis
  - Arch Perimeter Analysis
- Mandibular dentition (lower teeth)
  - Ashley Howe's Analysis
  - Carey's Analysis
- Both Arches (upper and lower teeth)
  - Bolton Analysis

== Mixed dentition analysis ==
- Moyer's Mixed Dentition Analysis
- Tanaka and Johnston Analysis
- Radiographic Analysis
- Ballard and Willie Analysis
- Huckaba's Analysis
- Staley Kerber Analysis
- Hixon and Old Father Analysis
- Tweed's analysis (cast + cephalometric)
- Total space analysis (cast + cephalometric + soft tissue)

== Dental arch analysis ==
- Intermolar Width - It is the distance between the mesiobuccal cusp tip points of the first permanent molars
- Intercanine Width - It is the distance between the tip of the cusp from canine to canine.
- Arch Length - It is the distance from the line perpendicular to the mesiobuccal cusp tips of the first permanent molars to the midpoint between the mesioincisal points of the central incisors.
- Arch Perimeter - It is the distance from mesial contact of a permanent molar on one side to the mesial contact of permanent molar on the other side, with the line connecting the buccal/incisor tip points in the intervening teeth.

== Others ==
- Little's Irregularity Index
- Bolton analysis
