= Traveling microscope =

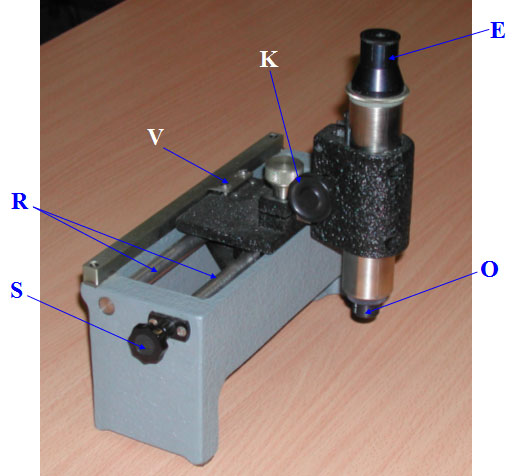
A traveling microscope. E—eyepiece, O—objective, K—knob for focusing, V—vernier, R—rails, S—screw for fine position adjustment.

A travelling microscope is an instrument for measuring length with a resolution typically in the order of 0.01mm. The precision is such that better-quality instruments have measuring scales made from Invar to avoid misreadings due to thermal effects. The instrument comprises a microscope mounted on two rails fixed to, or part of a very rigid bed. The position of the microscope can be varied coarsely by sliding along the rails, or finely by turning a screw. The eyepiece is fitted with fine cross-hairs to fix a precise position, which is then read off the vernier scale. Some instruments, such as that produced in the 1960s by the Precision Tool and Instrument Company of Thornton Heath, Surrey, England, also measure vertically. The purpose of the microscope is to aim at reference marks with much higher accuracy than is possible using the naked eye. It is used in laboratories to measure the refractive index of flat specimens using the geometrical concepts of ray optics (Duc de Chaulnes’ method). It is also used to measure very short distances precisely, for example the diameter of a capillary tube. This mechanical instrument has now largely been superseded by electronic- and optically based measuring devices that are both very much more accurate and considerably cheaper to produce.

== See also ==
- Cathetometer
