= Lysle E. Johnston Jr. =

American orthodontist

Lysle E. Johnston Jr. is an American orthodontist.

He was raised in East Jordan, Michigan, and began study at the University of Michigan College of Dentistry in 1957. He worked under James Scott at the University of Belfast in Ireland from 1961 to 1962, returning to earn an orthodontic Master of Science degree from Michigan in 1964. Johnston attended Case Western Reserve University for doctoral studies in anatomy, graduating in 1970. He taught at Case Western from 1971 to 1976, when he joined the Saint Louis University faculty. Johnston was appointed Robert W. Browne Professor of Dentistry and Chair of the Department of Orthodontics at the University of Michigan in 1991, and served until retirement in 2005.

Johnston has received several awards from many professional and associations and learned societies, among them the American Board of Orthodontics, the American Association of Orthodontists, and the Royal College of Surgeons of England. He was the 2018 recipient of the American Association of Orthodontists Lifetime Achievement Award in Orthodontic Research.
