= Dental erosion =

Medical condition

Acid erosion
- Other names: Dental erosion
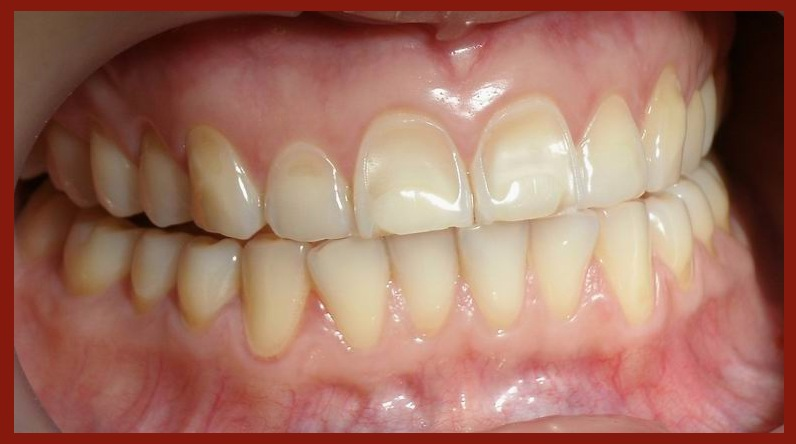
- An example of severe dental damage due to acid erosion.
- Specialty: Dentistry
- Complications: Oral infection, tooth decay, tooth loss, xerostomia

Acid erosion is a type of tooth wear. It is defined as the irreversible loss of tooth structure due to chemical dissolution by acids not of bacterial origin. Dental erosion is the most common chronic condition of children ages 5–17, although it is only relatively recently that it has been recognised as a dental health problem. There is widespread ignorance of the damaging effects of acid erosion; this is particularly the case with erosion due to consumption of fruit juices because they tend to be seen as healthy. Acid erosion begins initially in the enamel, causing it to become thin, and can progress into dentin, giving the tooth a dull yellow appearance and leading to dentin hypersensitivity.

The most common causes of erosion are acidic foods and drinks. In general, foods and drinks with a pH below 5.0–5.7 have been known to trigger dental erosion effects. Numerous clinical and laboratory reports link erosion to excessive consumption of such drinks. Those thought to pose a risk are soft drinks, some alcohol and fruit drinks, fruit juices such as orange juice (which contain citric acid) and carbonated drinks such as colas (in which the carbonic acid is not the cause of erosion, but citric and phosphoric acid). Additionally, wine has been shown to erode teeth, with the pH of wine as low as 3.0–3.8. Other possible sources of erosive acids are from exposure to poorly regulated chlorinated swimming pool water, and regurgitation of gastric acids. In children with chronic diseases, the use of medicines with acid components is a risk factor too. Dental erosion has also been recorded in the fossil record and was likely caused by the consumption of acidic fruits or plants.

== Causes ==
Frequently eaten foods and drinks below pH 5.0–5.7 may initiate dental erosion.

=== Extrinsic acidic sources ===
Extrinsic acid erosion is when the source of acid originates from outside of the body. Acidic food and drink lowers the pH level of the mouth resulting in demineralisation of the teeth. A variety of drinks contribute to dental erosion due to their low pH level. Examples include fruit juices, such as apple and orange juices, sports drinks, wine and beer. Carbonated drinks, such as colas and lemonades, are also very acidic and hence have significant erosive potential. Foods such as fresh fruits, ketchup and pickled food in vinegar have been implicated in causing acid erosion. Frequency rather than total intake of acidic juices is seen as the greater factor in dental erosion; infants using feeding bottles containing fruit juices (especially when used as a comforter) are therefore at greater risk of acid erosion.

Saliva acts as a buffer, regulating the pH when acidic drinks are ingested. Drinks vary in their resistance to the buffering effect of saliva. Studies show that fruit juices are the most resistant to saliva's buffering effect, followed by, in order: fruit-based carbonated drinks and flavoured mineral waters, non-fruit-based carbonated drinks, sparkling mineral waters; mineral water being the least resistant. Because of this, fruit juices in particular may prolong the drop in pH levels.

A number of medications such as chewable vitamin C, aspirin and some iron preparations are acidic and may contribute towards acid erosion. Certain drugs can cause hyposalivation (low quantity or quality of saliva) which is considered a risk factor for acid erosion.

=== Intrinsic acidic sources ===
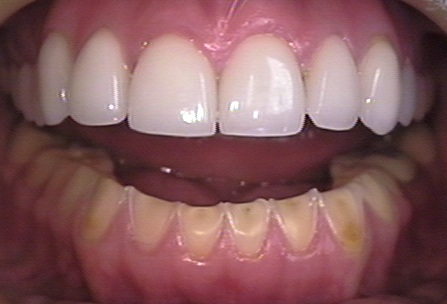
Severe wear of the lower teeth in a bulimic person.

Intrinsic dental erosion, also known as perimolysis, is the process whereby gastric acid from the stomach comes into contact with the teeth. This is often secondary to conditions such as anorexia nervosa, bulimia nervosa, gastroesophageal reflux disease (GERD) and rumination syndrome. Dental erosion can also occur by non-extrinsic factors. There is evidence linking eating disorders with a range of oral health problems including dental erosion, caries and xerostomia. Reduced salivary flow rate, a common symptom of bulimia, predisposes an individual to dental erosion due to increased vulnerability to the effects of acidic food and drinks. Self-induced vomiting increases the risk of dental erosion by a factor of 5.5 compared to healthy controls. Lesions are most commonly found on the palatal surfaces of the teeth, followed by the occlusal and then the buccal surfaces. The main cause of GERD is increased acid production by the stomach. This is not exclusive to adults, as GERD and other gastrointestinal disorders may cause dental erosions in children.

=== Behaviour ===
Acid erosion often coexists with abrasion and attrition. Abrasion is most often caused by brushing teeth too hard. Any frothing or swishing acidic drinks around the mouth before swallowing increases the risk of widespread acid erosion. Sucking citrus fruits can also contribute to acid erosion.

== Diagnosis ==
In-vivo studies are advantageous in assessing erosion directly from the patient's mouth. There are numerous signs of dental erosion, including changes in appearance and sensitivity.

=== Colour ===
One of the physical changes can be the colour of teeth. Dental erosion can lead to two major tooth colour change – the first being a change of colour that usually happens on the cutting edge of the central incisors. This causes the cutting edge of the tooth to become transparent. A second sign is a yellowish tint on the eroded tooth. This occurs because the white enamel has eroded away to reveal the yellowish dentin beneath. On top of clinical examination, the dentist may take intra-oral photographs to monitor the extent and progress of erosion. Clinical photographs lead to comparable results to a visual examination; however, both may result in an underestimation of the extent of tooth wear.

=== Shape ===
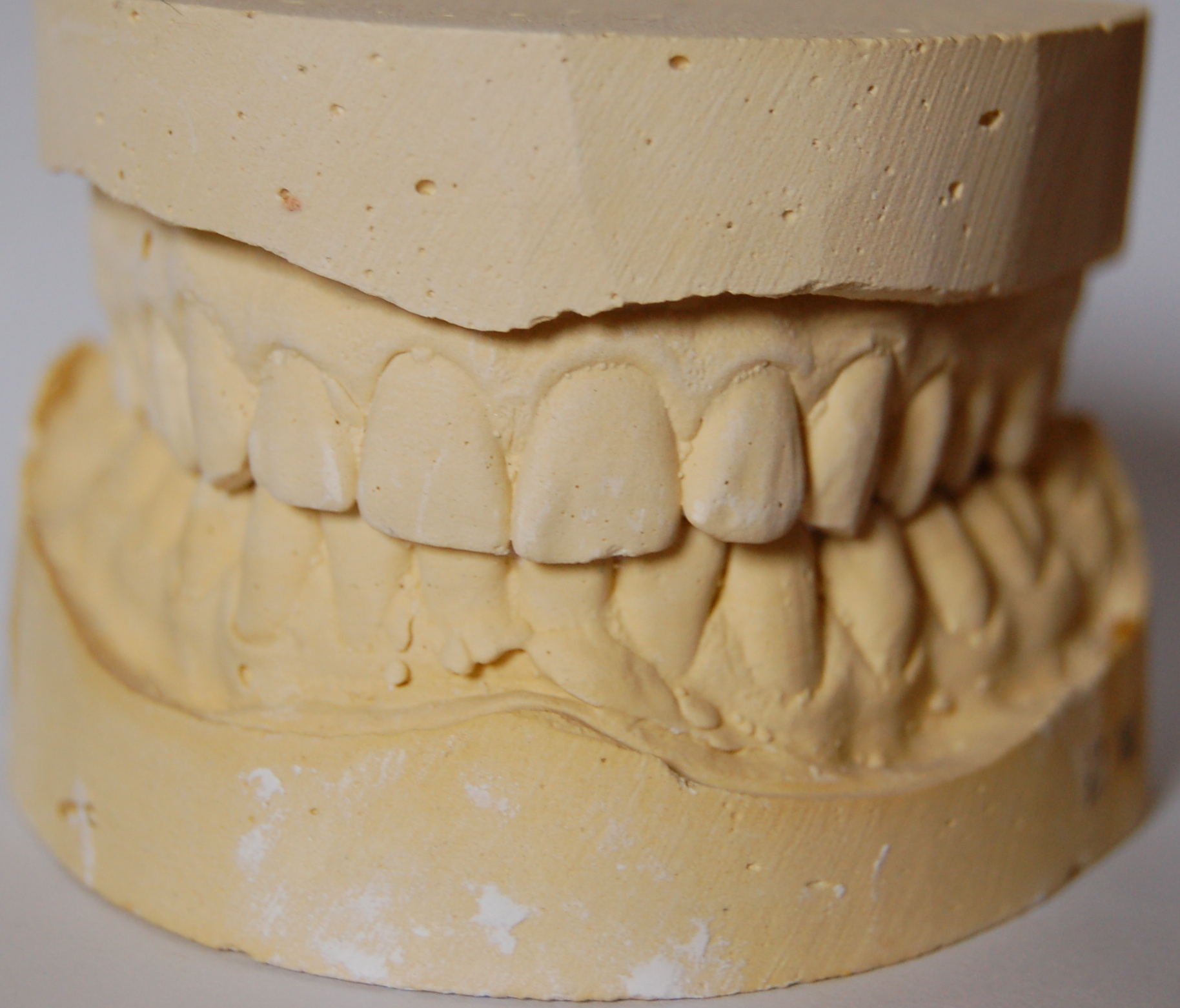
Dental study casts

A change in shape of the teeth is also a sign of dental erosion. Teeth will begin to appear with a broad rounded concavity, and the gaps between teeth will become larger. There can be evidence of wear on surfaces of teeth not expected to be in contact with one another. If dental erosion occurs in children, a loss of enamel surface characteristics can occur. Amalgam restorations in the mouth may be clean and non-tarnished. As tooth substance around restorations erodes away, fillings may also appear to be rising out of the tooth. The teeth may form divots on the chewing surfaces when dental erosion is occurring. This mainly happens on the first, second, and third molars. To monitor the change in shape over time, dentists can create and retain accurate, serial study casts. Dentists may also employ dental indices to guide their diagnosis and management of the condition. A scoring system referred to as Basic Erosive Wear Examination (BEWE) grades the appearance or severity of wear on the teeth by the extent of hard tissue loss. It is noted that indices are useful in monitoring the most severe clinical changes in tooth wear. However, they lack comprehensiveness as they cannot measure the rate of progression and cannot monitor all teeth affected by erosion. There is also a lack of an index which is universally accepted and standardised.

One of the most severe signs of dental erosion is cracking, where teeth begin to crack off and become coarse. Other signs include pain when eating hot, cold, or sweet foods. This pain is due to the enamel having been eroded away, exposing the sensitive dentin.

=== Optical properties ===
On the basis of the optical changes induced in eroded tissue by the lesions, in 2015 Koshoji et al. also demonstrated in a novel method that by using laser speckle images (LSI) it is possible to acquire information on the microstructure of the enamel and detect minimal changes, such as early non-carious lesions. No clinical data has been published to demonstrate the effectiveness of this technique in vivo.

== See also ==
- Tooth wear
- Abrasion
- Abfraction
- Attrition
- Bruxism
- Stephan curve
