= Dental attrition =

Loss of tooth substance caused by tooth-to-tooth contact

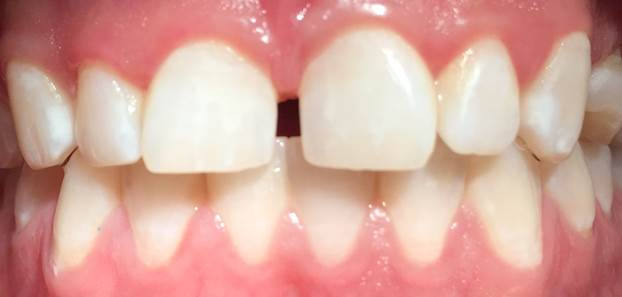
Loss of tooth characteristics

Dental attrition is a type of tooth wear caused by tooth-to-tooth contact, resulting in loss of tooth tissue, usually starting at the incisal or occlusal surfaces. Tooth wear is a physiological process and is commonly seen as a normal part of aging. Advanced and excessive wear and tooth surface loss can be defined as pathological in nature, requiring intervention by a dental practitioner. The pathological wear of the tooth surface can be caused by bruxism, which is clenching and grinding of the teeth. If the attrition is severe, the enamel can be completely worn away leaving underlying dentin exposed, resulting in an increased risk of dental caries and dentin hypersensitivity. It is best to identify pathological attrition at an early stage to prevent unnecessary loss of tooth structure as enamel does not regenerate.

== Signs and symptoms ==
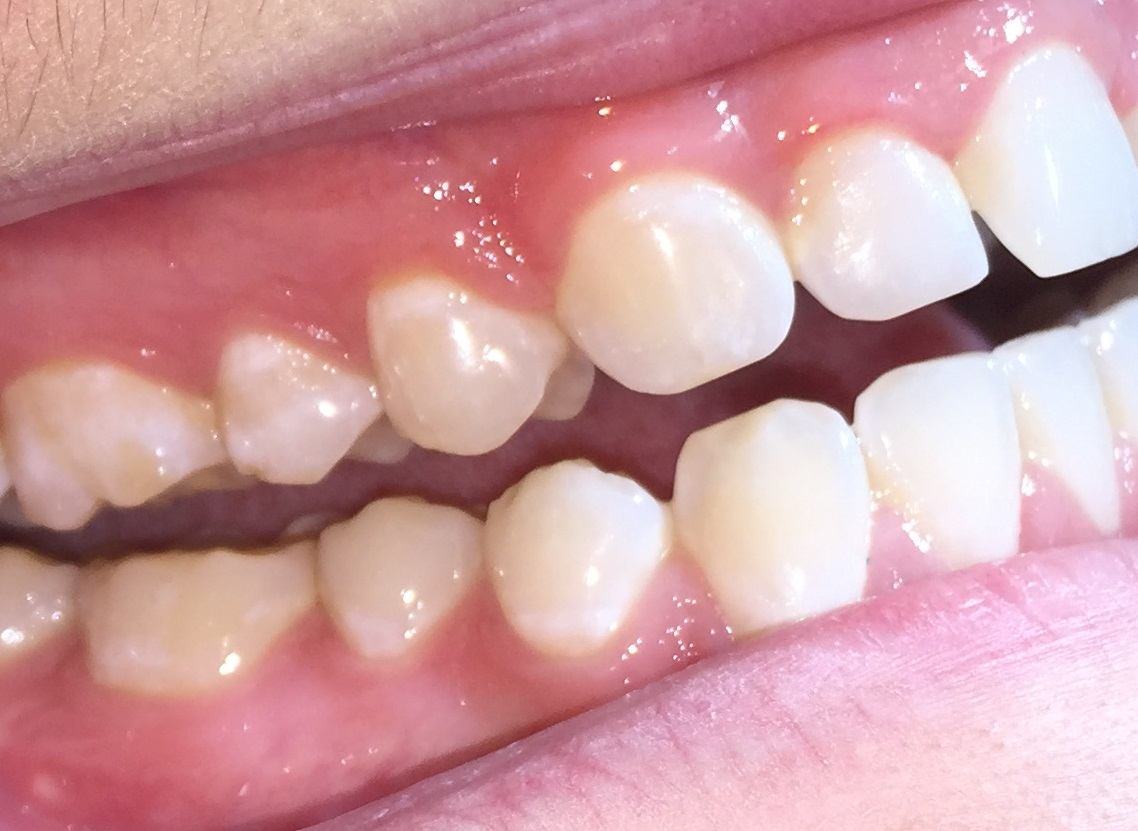
Typical appearance of attrition

Attrition occurs as a result of opposing tooth surfaces contacting. The contact can affect cuspal, incisal and proximal surface areas.

Indications of attrition can include:

- Loss of tooth anatomy: This results in loss of tooth characteristics including rounding or sharpening of incisal edges, loss of cusps and fracturing of teeth. Enamel of molar teeth may appear thin and flat. When in occlusion the teeth may appear the same height which is particularly apparent for anterior teeth.
- Sensitivity or pain: Attrition may be entirely asymptomatic, or there may be dentin hypersensitivity secondary to loss of the enamel layer, or tenderness of the periodontal ligament caused by occlusal trauma.
- Tooth discolouration: A yellow appearance of the tooth surface may be due to the enamel being worn away, exposing the darker yellower dentin layer underneath.
- Altered occlusion due to decreasing vertical height, or occlusal vertical dimension.
- Compromised periodontal support can result in tooth mobility and drifting of teeth
- Loss in posterior occlusal stability
- Mechanical failure of restorations

== Causes ==
Dental attrition is tooth wear caused by tooth to tooth contact. Well-defined wear facets appear on tooth cusps or ridges. This can be caused by several factors, including parafunctional habits such as bruxism or clenching, developmental defects, hard or rough-textured diet, and absence of posterior teeth support. If the natural teeth oppose or occlude with porcelain restorations, then accelerated attrition of the natural teeth may result. Similarly, when an edge to edge class III incisal relationship is present dental attrition can occur. The underlying cause of attrition may be related to the temporomandibular joint as a disruption or dysfunction of the joint can result in compromised function and complications such as bruxism and clenching of the jaw may arise

The etiology of dental attrition is multifactorial one of the most common causes of attrition is bruxism, one of the major causes being the use of MDMA (ecstasy) and various other related entactogenic drugs. Bruxism is the para-functional movement of the mandible, occurring during the day or night. It can be associated with presence of audible sound when clenching or grinding the teeth. This is usually reported by parents or partners if the grinding occurs during sleep. In some cases, dental erosion is also associated with severe dental attrition. Dental erosion is tooth surface loss caused by extrinsic or intrinsic forms of acid. Extrinsic erosion is due to a highly acidic diet, while intrinsic erosion is caused by regurgitation of gastric acids. Erosion softens the dental hard tissues making them more susceptible to attrition. Thus, if erosion and bruxism both exist, surface loss due to attrition is faster. Severe attrition in young patients is usually associated with erosive factors in their diets. The different physiological processes of tooth wear (abrasion, attrition and erosion) usually occur simultaneously and rarely work individually. Therefore, it is important to understand these tooth wear processes and their interactions to determine causes of tooth surface loss. Demineralization of the tooth surface due to acids can cause occlusal erosion as well as attrition. Wedge-shaped cervical lesions are commonly found in association with occlusal erosion and attrition.

Tooth wear is typically seen in the elderly and can be referred to as a natural aging process. Attrition, abrasion, erosion or a combination of these factors are the main reasons for tooth wear in elderly people who retain their natural teeth. This tooth wear can be pathological or physiological. The number of teeth with incisal or occlusal wear increases with age. Attrition occurs in 1 in 3 adolescents.

In addition to other occlusal factors, independent variables such as male gender, bruxism, and loss of molar occlusal contact, edge-to-edge relation of incisors, unilateral buccolingual cusp-to-cusp relation, and unemployment have been identified in affecting occlusal wear. Similarly, anterior cross-bite, unilateral posterior cross-bite, and anterior crowding have been found to be protective factors for high occlusal wear levels.

== Prevention and management ==
To manage the condition, it is important to first diagnose it, describing the type of tooth surface loss, its severity and location. Early diagnosis is essential to ensure tooth wear has not progressed past the point of restoration. A thorough examination is required, because it might give explanation to the aetiology of the TSL.

The examination should include assessment of:

- Temporomandibular joint function and associated musculature
- Orthodontic examination
- Intra oral soft tissue analysis
- Hard tissue analysis
- Location and severity of tooth wear
- Social history, particularly diet

It is important to record severity of tooth wear for monitoring purposes, helping to differentiate between pathological and physiological tooth surface loss. It is essential to determine whether the tooth wear is ongoing or has stabilized. However where generalised, the underlying cause can be assumed to be bruxism. In fast-progressing cases, there is commonly a coexisting erosive diet contributing to tooth surface loss.

=== Prevention ===
When a diagnosis of bruxism has been confirmed, it is recommended that the patient buy a full-coverage acrylic occlusal splint, such as a Michigan splint or Tanner appliance, to prevent further bruxism. Patients must be monitored closely, with clinical photographs 6–12 monthly to evaluate if the tooth surface loss is being prevented.

=== Treatment ===
Cosmetic or functional intervention may be required if tooth surface loss is pathological or if there has been advanced loss of tooth structure. The first stage of treatment involves managing any associated conditions, such as fractured teeth or sharp cusps or incisal edges. These can be resolved by restoring and polishing sharp cusps. Then, desensitizing agents such as topical fluoride varnishes can be applied, and at home desensitising toothpastes recommended. Many restorative options have been proposed, such as direct composite restorations, bonded cast metal restorations, removable partial dentures, orthodontic treatment, crown lengthening procedures and protective splints.

The decision to restore the dentition depends on the wants and needs of the patient, the severity of tooth surface loss and whether tooth surface loss is active. Treatment options have been systematically reviewed. Clinical practice guidelines recommend indirect, less invasive options for initial treatment. The use of adhesive materials to replace lost tooth structure can be performed as a conservative and cost-effective approach before a more permanent solution of crowns or veneers is considered.

=== Protective mouthguard ===
A mouthguard is a removable oral appliance that fits over the teeth to protect them from grinding, clenching, and other sources of pressure or impact. A mouthguard is most often used to prevent injury and to treat bruxism or temporomandibular joint (TMJ) disorders, or as part of certain dental procedures such as tooth whitening or the treatment of sleep apnea. People prone to nocturnal bruxism, or nighttime jaw clenching, may regularly wear occlusal splints at night. It is also useful in managing dental wear.

== See also ==
- Abfraction
