= Cementoenamel junction =

Region on a tooth's surface where cementum and enamel join

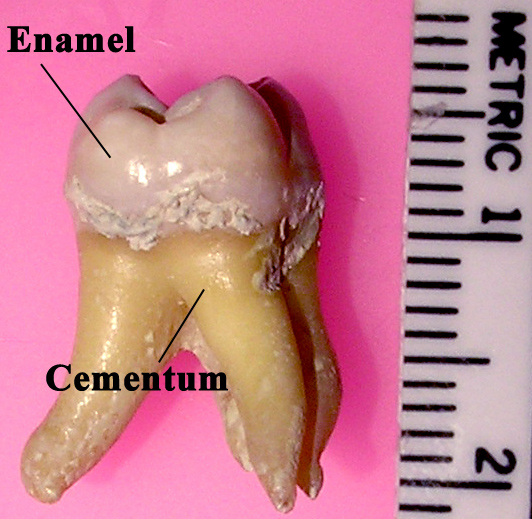
- Labeled molar

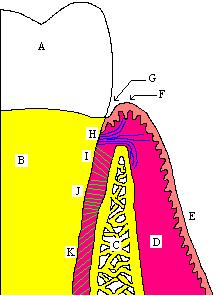
- The CEJ is the more or less horizontal demarcation line that distinguishes the crown (A) of the tooth from root (B) of the tooth.

Identifiers
- MeSH: D019237
- TA2: 926
- FMA: 55627

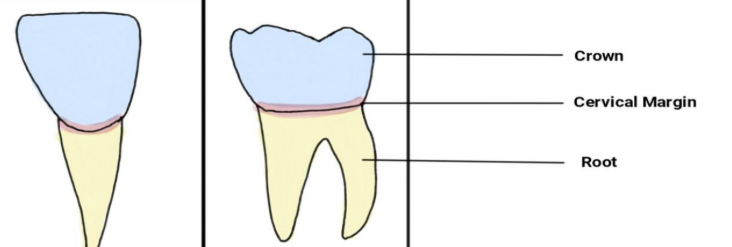
Cervical margin of the tooth

In dental anatomy, the cementoenamel junction (CEJ) is the location where the enamel, which covers the anatomical crown of a tooth, and the cementum, which covers the anatomical root of a tooth, meet. Informally it is known as the neck of the tooth. The border created by these two dental tissues has much significance as it is usually the location where the gingiva (gums) attaches to a healthy tooth by fibers called the gingival fibers. It is almost synonymous with the cervical margin, where the crown and root meet, and is also referred to as the tooth's neck or cervical line.

Active recession of the gingiva reveals the cementoenamel junction in the mouth and is usually a sign of an unhealthy condition. The loss of attachment is considered a more reliable indicator of periodontal disease. The CEJ is the site of major tooth resorption. A significant proportion of tooth loss is caused by tooth resorption, which occurs in 5 to 10 percent of the population. The clinical location of CEJ which is a static landmark, serves as a crucial anatomical site for the measurement of probing pocket depth (PPD) and clinical attachment level (CAL). The CEJ varies between subjects, but also between teeth from the same person.

There exists a normal variation in the relationship of the cementum and the enamel at the cementoenamel junction. In about 60–65% of teeth, the cementum overlaps the enamel at the CEJ, while in about 30% of teeth, the cementum and enamel abut each other with no overlap. In only 5–10% of teeth, there is a space between the enamel and the cementum at which the underlying dentin is exposed.

== Anatomy ==
The cervical margin, also known as the cervical line or neck of the tooth, represents the boundary between the enamel covering the crown and the cementum covering the root. The cementum typically overlaps the enamel, although in some cases, it may meet edge-to-edge.

The cervical region includes the residual tooth structure between the gingival margin and the bone crest, encompassing the supragingival tooth area (STA) and gingival sulcus.

The curvature of the CEJ varies and is influenced by the height of the contact area and the crown's buccolingual diameter. Proximal cervical curvatures are more pronounced on mesial surfaces, with central incisors exhibiting the most significant curvature, progressively decreasing toward posterior teeth . However, relationship between CEJ and cervical margin is often suggested as age related factor, as there could be extra gingiva covering the anatomical crown in a 10 - year old child, meanwhile old adults with periodontal disease can reveal their CEJ due to gingival recession. Despite this, gingival margin and CEJ are still consistently on the same or almost same location on a healthy adult. There are three possible relationships at the CEJ: Cementum overlaps enamel (65% of cases), cementum and enamel meet end-to-end (25%), dentin is exposed due to a gap between enamel and cementum (10%) and these variations can occur around different areas of the same tooth.

=== Histology ===
Histologically, the cervical margin area can be appreciated by the gingiva histology surrounding the curvature, or cemento-enamel junction that aligns on the same location on a healthy tooth individual. However, due to pathological reasons such as gingival recession or periodontitis, the gingival margin may get located below CEJ, hence histologically it is difficult to have a precise sample to study on.

== Formation ==
In the tooth bud, regions where enamel formation is completed, the enamel organ gives rise to Hertwig's epithelial root sheath, composed of two epithelial layers derived from the external and internal epithelia. The sheath is irregularly fragmented in time and space as it promotes cementum deposition on the newly formed dentin. After this fragmentation, Hertwig's epithelial root sheath also participates in cementogenesis and formation of the periodontal ligament, giving rise to the epithelial rests of Malassez. This irregular fragmentation of Hertwig's epithelial root sheath yields an equally irregular limit of cervical enamel and an irregular onset of formation and deposition of cementum. Consequently, the relationship between cementum and enamel at the CEJ presents an irregular contour, as observed during scanning electron microscope (SEM) analysis of the primary teeth.

Fragmentation of Hertwig's epithelial root sheath and exposure of dentin covered by a thin layer of intermediate cementum are fundamental for the onset of cementogenesis. If Hertwig's epithelial root sheath is not fragmented, there will be enamel deposition and it will be transformed into reduced epithelium, thus preventing cementum deposition on its surface.

== Types ==
- Coronal cementum - where the enamel overlaps the cement.
- Abutment - It is also known as vis a vis relation, where the cement and enamel meet at the butt joint, occurring in 30% of sections, and the least common, occurring in 10% of sections.
- Gap between cementum and enamel exposing the dentin.

== Curvature ==
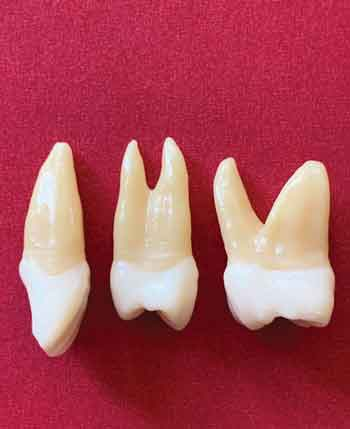
Comparison of the cementoenamel junction on the mesial surfaces of the maxillary central, first bicuspid, and first molar

The shape and location of the cementoenamel junction (CEJ) on each tooth surface should be considered. CEJs differ from tooth to tooth in terms of their anatomy. The curvature of the CEJ is greatest on anterior teeth due to the narrow profile of these teeth. On the anteriors, the distal aspect's curvature is usually one mm lower than the mesial aspect. Posterior teeth have flatter CEJ curvatures on the inter-proximal surfaces in comparison to the anteriors.

== Teeth resorption ==
Root resorption often starts at cementoenamel junction (CEJ) in teeth. Types of tooth resorption include internal resorption and external resorption.

=== Internal ===
There are two types of internal resorption - root canal (internal) replacement resorption and internal inflammatory resorption.

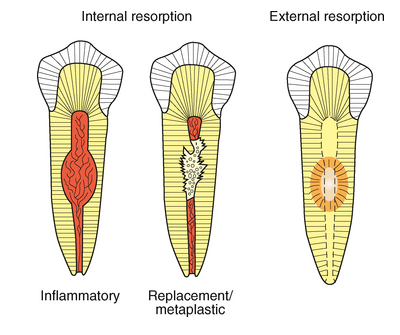
Types of Resorption

=== External ===
External resorption can be classified into four categories by its clinical and histologic manifestations: external surface resorption, external inflammatory root resorption, replacement resorption, and ankylosis. External inflammatory root resorption can be further categorized into cervical resorption with or without a vital pulp (invasive cervical root resorption) and external apical root resorption.

== Periodontal consideration ==
=== Biological width ===
The biological width is a crucial factor in maintaining periodontal health. It refers to the soft tissue dimensions coronal to the alveolar bone, consisting of junctional epithelium and supracrestal connective tissue attachment. However, by violating the biological width during restorative procedures can lead to periodontal breakdown, inflammation, gingival recession, and bone loss. Gargiulo et al. (1961) established that the biological width is approximately 2.04 mm, composed of epithelial and connective tissue components.

=== Importance ===
Subgingival crown margins can contribute to gingivitis and periodontitis, leading to attachment loss, and improperly placed restoration margins and ill-fitting restorations violate the biological width, impacting periodontal health. Key considerations for subgingival margins include: proper contouring in the gingival third, polishing and rounding of the margin, ensuring an adequate zone of attached gingiva, avoiding biological width violation, regular maintenance and patient compliance to prevent periodontal issues.

== Diseases of cervical margin area ==
Due to the cervical margin area being extremely close to the cervical part of tooth, the diseases related are usually overlapping with other diseases that could happen in the area.

=== Carious lesions ===
Caries occurring at the cervical region of the tooth are often linked to carious cervical lesions (CCLs), which are commonly found in patients with poor oral hygiene or exposed root surfaces due to improper brushing technique.

=== Non Cervical carious lesions (NCCL) ===
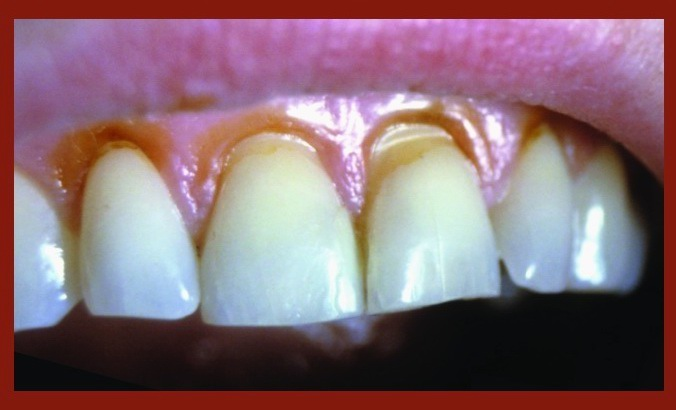
NCCL, a type of lesion seen in dental diseases due to parafunctional habits

- Abfraction: Caused by occlusal forces leading to microfractures in the enamel and dentin
- Abrasion: Mechanical wear due to habits like aggressive tooth brushing
- Erosion: Chemical dissolution from acidic foods, beverages, or gastric reflux

=== Common treatments ===
==== Non-Carious Cervical Lesion (NCCL) Management ====
Composite restorations commonly restore lost tooth structure, and Glass Ionomer Cement commonly used too due to difficulty in moisture control

==== Deep Margin Elevation (DME) ====
As proposed by Diestschi and Spreafico, this technique involves coronally repositioning sub-gingival margins using composite resin. It aids in dental dam isolation, impression-taking, restoration placement, and finishing. It is a conservative alternative to crown lengthening, which requires the removal of bone and gingival tissue. Moreover, DME improves bonding strength and marginal integrity, especially in cases where indirect restorations are planned. The Immediate Dentin Sealing (IDS) technique, often performed alongside DME, enhances bond strength, reduces marginal leakage, and minimizes post-operative sensitivity

== Clinical relevance ==
=== Endodontics ===
In endodontics, gaining access to the pulp chamber is an essential step to complete procedures such as Root Canal Treatment or Pulpotomy. According to the Law of Centrality in Endodontics, the pulp chamber of the tooth is located at the level of the cementoenamel junction.

The cervical margin area is extremely critical in determining the success of few restorations in dentistry, such as crowns and bridges. A good preparation around the cervical margin area, or the tooth structure near the cervical margin ensures the preparation is able to provide marginal integrity for accurate fit of the crown, reduced overhang between crown and cement to prevent bacteria or plaque accumulation. and providing resistance to occlusal forces to prevent fracture of the restorative material.
