= Human tooth =

Calcified whitish structure in humans' mouths used to break down food

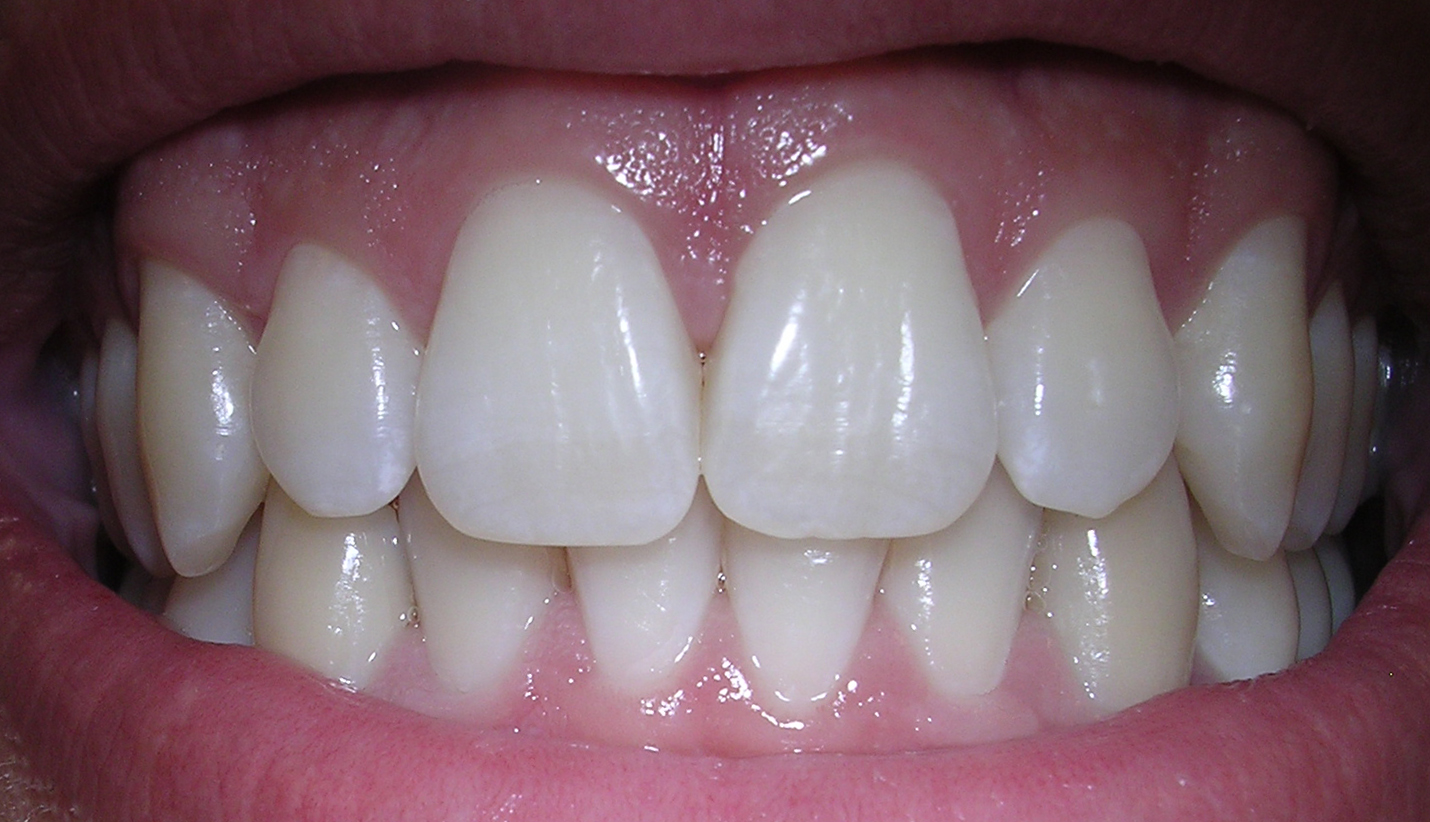
- Image showing incisors and canine teeth, situated in gums above and below

Details

Identifiers
- Latin: dens
- TA2: 914

Human teeth function to mechanically break down items of food by cutting and crushing them in preparation for swallowing and digesting. As such, they are considered part of the human digestive system. Humans have four types of teeth: incisors, canines, premolars, and molars, which each have a specific function. The incisors cut the food, the canines tear the food and the molars and premolars crush the food. The roots of teeth are embedded in the maxilla (upper jaw) or the mandible (lower jaw) and are covered by gums. Teeth are made of multiple tissues of varying density and hardness.

Humans, like most other mammals, are diphyodont, meaning that they develop two sets of teeth. The first set, deciduous teeth, also called "primary teeth", "baby teeth", or "milk teeth", normally eventually contains 20 teeth. Primary teeth typically start to appear ("erupt") around six months of age and this may be distracting and/or painful for the infant. However, some babies are born with one or more visible teeth, known as neonatal teeth or "natal teeth".

== Structure ==
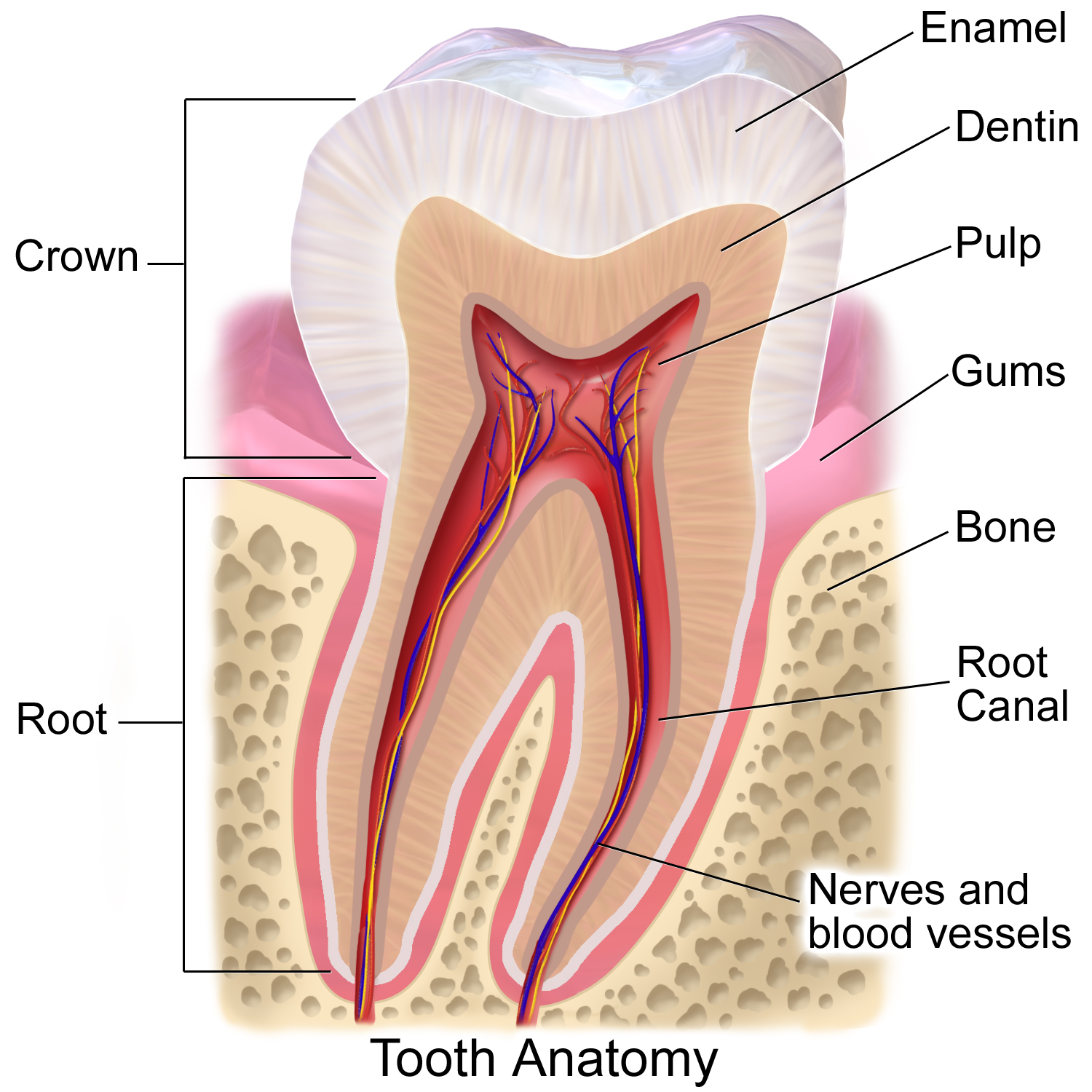
Diagram of molar anatomy

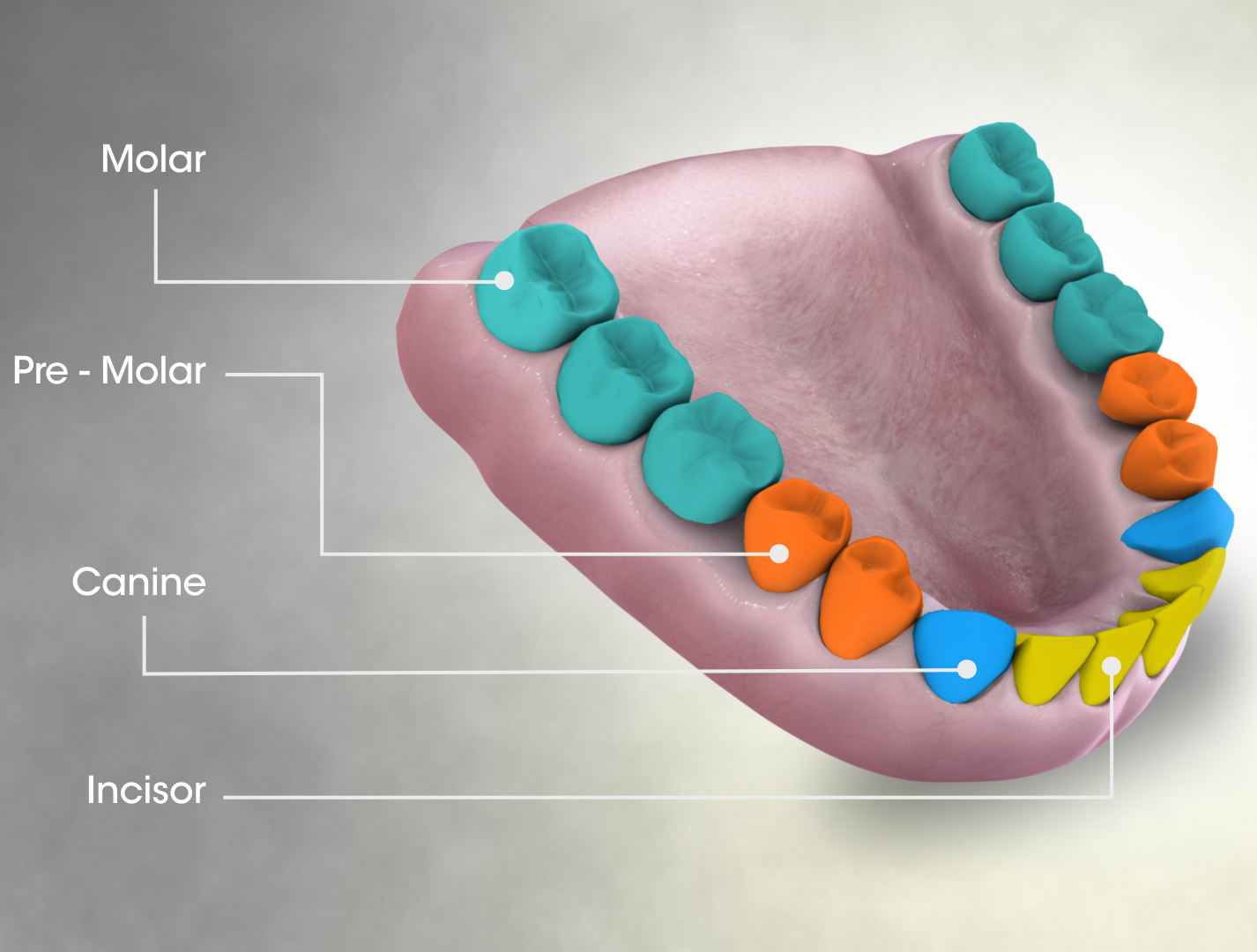
3D rendering showing the types of teeth

Dental anatomy is dedicated to the study of tooth structure. The development, appearance, and classification of teeth fall within its field of study, though dental occlusion, or contact between teeth, does not. Dental anatomy is also a taxonomic science as it is concerned with the naming of teeth and their structures. This information serves a practical purpose for dentists, enabling them to easily identify and describe teeth and structures during treatment.

The anatomic crown of a tooth is the area covered in enamel above the cementoenamel junction (CEJ) or "neck" of the tooth. Most of the crown is composed of dentin ("dentine" in British English) with the pulp chamber inside. The crown is within bone before eruption. After eruption, it is almost always visible. The anatomic root is found below the CEJ and is covered with cementum. As with the crown, dentin composes most of the root, which normally has pulp canals. Canines and most premolars, except for maxillary first premolars, usually have one root. Maxillary first premolars and mandibular molars usually have two roots. Maxillary molars usually have three roots. Additional roots are referred to as supernumerary roots.

Humans usually have 20 primary (deciduous, "baby" or "milk") teeth and 32 permanent (adult) teeth. Teeth are classified as incisors, canines, premolars (also called bicuspids), and molars. Incisors are primarily used for cutting, canines are for tearing, and molars serve for grinding.

Most teeth have identifiable features that distinguish them from others. There are several different notation systems to refer to a specific tooth. The three most common systems are the FDI World Dental Federation notation (ISO 3950), the Universal Numbering System, and the Palmer notation. The FDI system is used worldwide, the Universal only in the United States, while the older Palmer notation still has some adherents only in the United Kingdom.

=== Primary teeth ===
Among deciduous (primary) teeth, ten are found in the maxilla (upper jaw) and ten in the mandible (lower jaw), for a total of 20. The dental formula for primary teeth in humans is 2.1.0.22.1.0.2.

In the primary set of teeth, in addition to the canines there are two types of incisors—centrals and laterals—and two types of molars—first and second. All primary teeth are normally later replaced with their permanent counterparts.

The Universal Numbering System for adult human teeth, used in the USA. The view is from a dental practitioner's perspective, meaning tooth 1 is the upper right rear (third) molar. Most countries use the FDI numbering system.

=== Permanent teeth ===
Among permanent teeth, 16 are found in the maxilla and 16 in the mandible, for a total of 32. The dental formula is 2.1.2.32.1.2.3. Permanent human teeth are numbered in a boustrophedonic sequence.

The maxillary teeth are the maxillary central incisors (teeth 8 and 9 in the diagram), maxillary lateral incisors (7 and 10), maxillary canines (6 and 11), maxillary first premolars (5 and 12), maxillary second premolars (4 and 13), maxillary first molars (3 and 14), maxillary second molars (2 and 15), and maxillary third molars (1 and 16). The mandibular teeth are the mandibular central incisors (24 and 25), mandibular lateral incisors (23 and 26), mandibular canines (22 and 27), mandibular first premolars (21 and 28), mandibular second premolars (20 and 29), mandibular first molars (19 and 30), mandibular second molars (18 and 31), and mandibular third molars (17 and 32). Third molars are commonly called "wisdom teeth" and usually emerge at ages 17 to 25. These molars may never erupt into the mouth or form at all. When they do form, they often must be removed. If any additional teeth form—for example, fourth and fifth molars, which are rare—they are referred to as supernumerary teeth (hyperdontia). Development of fewer than the usual number of teeth is called hypodontia.

There are small differences between the teeth of males and females, with male teeth along with the male jaw tending to be larger on average than female teeth and jaw. There are also differences in the internal dental tissue proportions, with male teeth consisting of proportionately more dentin while female teeth have proportionately more enamel.

== Parts ==
=== Enamel ===
Enamel is the hardest and most highly mineralized substance of the body. It has its origin from oral ectoderm. It is one of the four major tissues which make up the tooth, along with dentin, cementum, and dental pulp. It is normally visible and must be supported by underlying dentin. 96% of enamel consists of mineral, with water and organic material comprising the rest. The normal color of enamel varies from light yellow to grayish white. At the edges of teeth where there is no dentin underlying the enamel, the color sometimes has a slightly blue tone. Since enamel is semitranslucent, the color of dentin and any restorative dental material underneath the enamel strongly affects the appearance of a tooth. Enamel varies in thickness over the surface of the tooth and is often thickest at the cusp, up to 2.5mm, and thinnest at its border, which is seen clinically as the CEJ. The wear rate of enamel, called attrition, is 8 micrometers a year from normal factors.

Enamel's primary mineral is hydroxyapatite, which is a crystalline calcium phosphate. The large amount of minerals in enamel accounts not only for its strength but also for its brittleness. Dentin, which is less mineralized and less brittle, compensates for enamel and is necessary as a support. Unlike dentin and bone, enamel does not contain collagen. Proteins of note in the development of enamel are ameloblastins, amelogenins, enamelins and tuftelins. It is believed that they aid in the development of enamel by serving as framework support, among other functions. In rare circumstances enamel can fail to form, leaving the underlying dentin exposed on the surface.

=== Dentin ===
Dentin is the substance between enamel or cementum and the pulp chamber. It is secreted by the odontoblasts of the dental pulp. The formation of dentin is known as dentinogenesis. The porous, yellow-hued material is made up of 70% inorganic materials, 20% organic materials, and 10% water by weight. Because it is softer than enamel, it decays more rapidly and is subject to severe cavities if not properly treated, but dentin still acts as a protective layer and supports the crown of the tooth.

Dentin is a mineralized connective tissue with an organic matrix of collagenous proteins. Dentin has microscopic channels, called dentinal tubules, which radiate outward through the dentin from the pulp cavity to the exterior cementum or enamel border. The diameter of these tubules range from 2.5 μm near the pulp, to 1.2 μm in the midportion, and 900 nm near the dentino-enamel junction. Although they may have tiny side-branches, the tubules do not intersect with each other. Their length is dictated by the radius of the tooth. The three dimensional configuration of the dentinal tubules is genetically determined.

There are three types of dentin, primary, secondary and tertiary. Secondary dentin is a layer of dentin produced after root formation and continues to form with age. Tertiary dentin is created in response to stimulus, such as cavities and tooth wear.

=== Cementum ===
Cementum is a specialized bone-like substance covering the root of a tooth. It is approximately 45% inorganic material (mainly hydroxyapatite), 33% organic material (mainly collagen) and 22% water. Cementum is excreted by cementoblasts within the root of the tooth and is thickest at the root apex. Its coloration is yellowish and it is softer than dentin and enamel. The principal role of cementum is to serve as a medium by which the periodontal ligaments can attach to the tooth for stability. At the cement to enamel junction, the cementum is acellular due to its lack of cellular components, and this acellular type covers at least 2/3 of the root. The more permeable form of cementum, cellular cementum, covers about 1/3 of the root apex.

=== Dental pulp ===
The dental pulp is the central part of the tooth filled with soft connective tissue. This tissue contains blood vessels and nerves that enter the tooth from a hole at the apex of the root. Along the border between the dentin and the pulp are odontoblasts, which initiate the formation of dentin. Other cells in the pulp include fibroblasts, preodontoblasts, macrophages and T lymphocytes. The pulp is commonly called "the nerve" of the tooth.

== Development ==
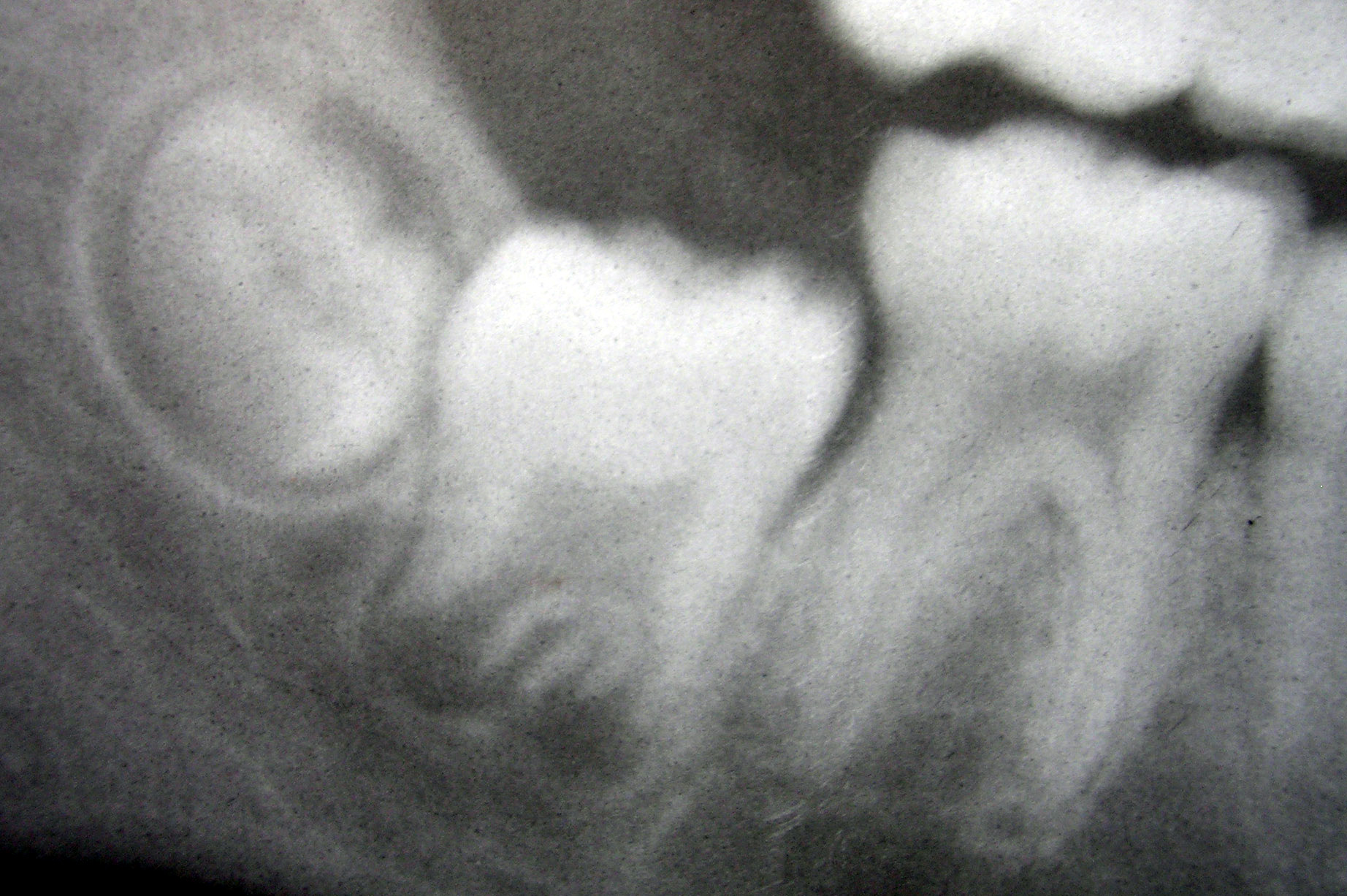
Radiograph of lower right third, second, and first molars in different stages of development

Tooth development is the complex process by which teeth form from embryonic cells, grow, and erupt into the mouth. Although many diverse species have teeth, their development is largely the same as in humans. For human teeth to have a healthy oral environment, enamel, dentin, cementum, and the periodontium must all develop during appropriate stages of fetal development. Primary teeth start to form in the development of the embryo between the sixth and eighth weeks, and permanent teeth begin to form in the twentieth week. If teeth do not start to develop at or near these times, they will not develop at all.

A significant amount of research has focused on determining the processes that initiate tooth development. It is widely accepted that there is a factor within the tissues of the first pharyngeal arch that is necessary for the development of teeth.

Tooth development is commonly divided into the following stages: the bud stage, the cap, the bell, and finally maturation. The staging of tooth development is an attempt to categorize changes that take place along a continuum; frequently it is difficult to decide what stage should be assigned to a particular developing tooth. This determination is further complicated by the varying appearance of different histologic sections of the same developing tooth, which can appear to be different stages.

The tooth bud (sometimes called the tooth germ) is an aggregation of cells that eventually forms a tooth. It is organized into three parts: the enamel organ, the dental papilla and the dental follicle. The enamel organ is composed of the outer enamel epithelium, inner enamel epithelium, stellate reticulum and stratum intermedium. These cells give rise to ameloblasts, which produce enamel and the reduced enamel epithelium. The growth of cervical loop cells into the deeper tissues forms Hertwig's Epithelial Root Sheath, which determines a tooth's root shape. The dental papilla contains cells that develop into odontoblasts, which are dentin-forming cells. Additionally, the junction between the dental papilla and inner enamel epithelium determines the crown shape of a tooth. The dental follicle gives rise to three important cells: cementoblasts, osteoblasts, and fibroblasts. Cementoblasts form the cementum of a tooth. Osteoblasts give rise to the alveolar bone around the roots of teeth. Fibroblasts develop the periodontal ligaments which connect teeth to the alveolar bone through cementum.

=== Eruption ===
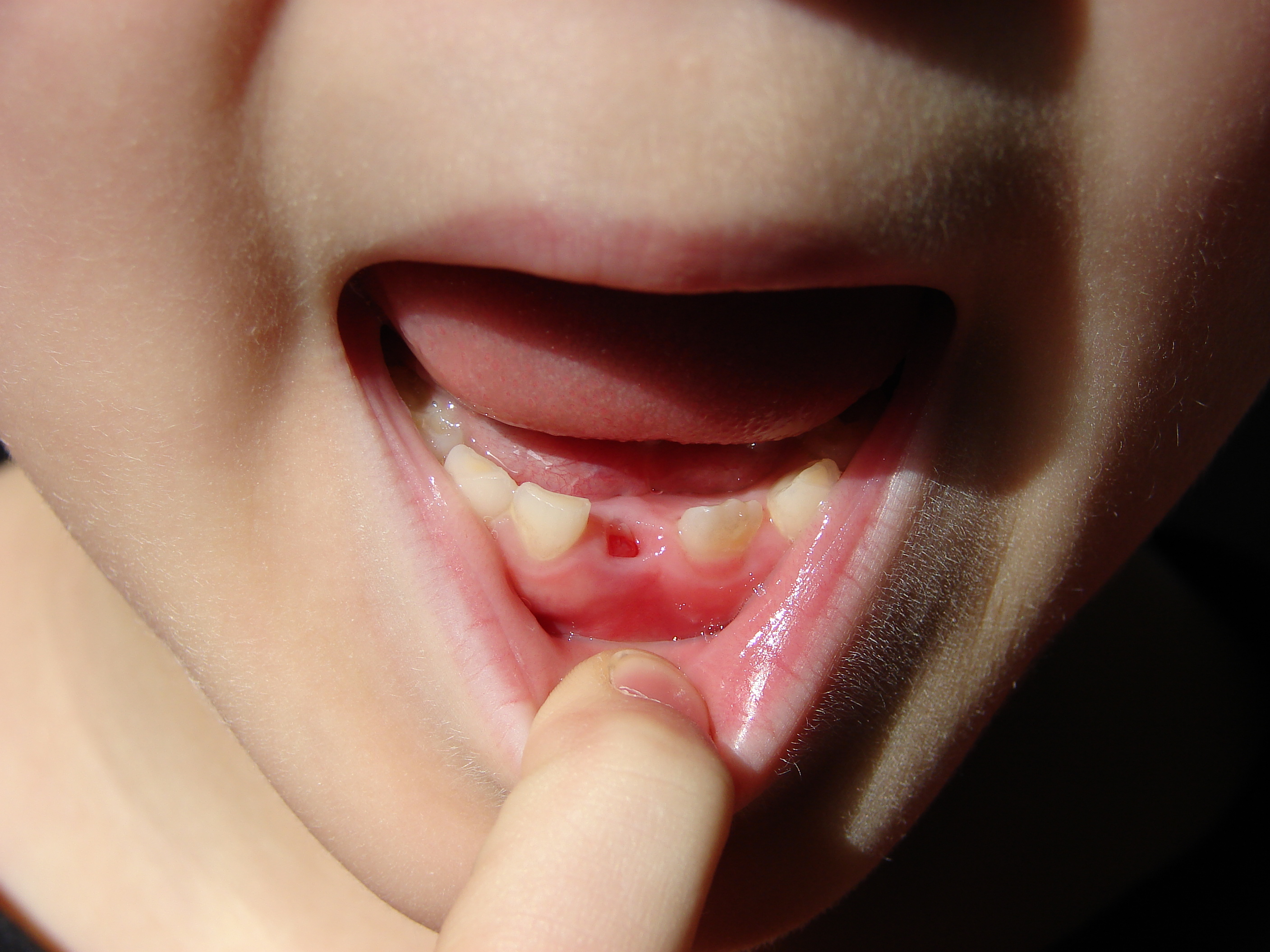
Bottom teeth of a seven-year-old, showing primary teeth (left), a lost primary tooth (middle), and a permanent tooth (right)

Tooth eruption in humans is a process in tooth development in which the teeth enter the mouth and become visible. Current research indicates that the periodontal ligaments play an important role in tooth eruption. Primary teeth erupt into the mouth from around six months until two years of age. These teeth are the only ones in the mouth until a person is about six years old. At that time, the first permanent tooth erupts. This stage, during which a person has a combination of primary and permanent teeth, is known as the mixed stage. The mixed stage lasts until the last primary tooth is lost and the remaining permanent teeth erupt into the mouth.

There have been many theories about the cause of tooth eruption. One theory proposes that the developing root of a tooth pushes it into the mouth. Another, known as the cushioned hammock theory, resulted from microscopic study of teeth, which was thought to show a ligament around the root. It was later discovered that the "ligament" was merely an artifact created in the process of preparing the slide. Currently, the most widely held belief is that the periodontal ligaments provide the main impetus for the process.

The onset of primary tooth loss has been found to correlate strongly with somatic and psychological criteria of school readiness.

== Supporting structures ==
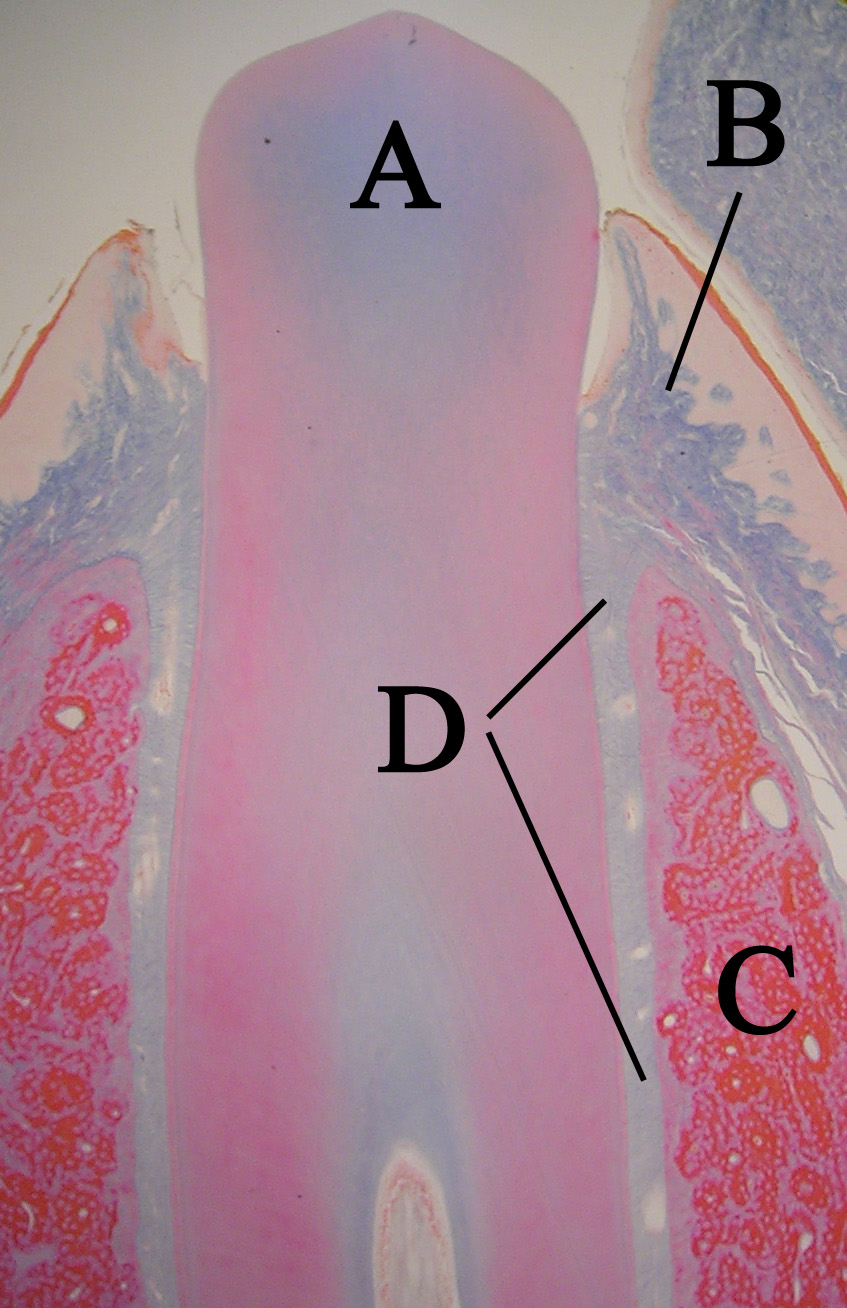
Histologic slide of tooth erupting into the mouth A: tooth B: gingiva C: bone D: periodontal ligaments

The periodontium is the supporting structure of a tooth, helping to attach the tooth to surrounding tissues and to allow sensations of touch and pressure. It consists of the cementum, periodontal ligaments, alveolar bone, and gingiva. Of these, cementum is the only one that is a part of a tooth. Periodontal ligaments connect the alveolar bone to the cementum. Alveolar bone surrounds the roots of teeth to provide support and creates what is commonly called an alveolus, or "socket". Lying over the bone is the gingiva or gum, which is readily visible in the mouth.

=== Periodontal ligaments ===
The periodontal ligament is a specialized connective tissue that attaches the cementum of a tooth to the alveolar bone. This tissue covers the root of the tooth within the bone. Each ligament has a width of 0.15–0.38mm, but this size decreases over time. The functions of the periodontal ligaments include attachment of the tooth to the bone, support for the tooth, formation and resorption of bone during tooth movement, sensation, and eruption. The cells of the periodontal ligaments include osteoblasts, osteoclasts, fibroblasts, macrophages, cementoblasts, and epithelial cell rests of Malassez. Consisting of mostly Type I and III collagen, the fibers are grouped in bundles and named according to their location. The groups of fibers are named alveolar crest, horizontal, oblique, periapical, and interradicular fibers. The nerve supply generally enters from the bone apical to the tooth and forms a network around the tooth toward the crest of the gingiva. When pressure is exerted on a tooth, such as during chewing or biting, the tooth moves slightly in its socket and puts tension on the periodontal ligaments. The nerve fibers can then send the information to the central nervous system for interpretation.

=== Alveolar bone ===
The alveolar bone is the bone of the jaw which forms the alveolus around teeth. Like any other bone in the human body, alveolar bone is modified throughout life. Osteoblasts form bone and osteoclasts remove it, especially if force is placed on a tooth. As is the case when movement of teeth is attempted through orthodontics, an area of bone under compressive force from a tooth moving toward it has a high osteoclast level, resulting in bone resorption. An area of bone receiving tension from periodontal ligaments attached to a tooth moving away from it has a high number of osteoblasts, resulting in bone formation.

=== Gingiva ===
The gingiva ("gums") is the mucosal tissue that overlays the jaws. There are three different types of epithelium associated with the gingiva: gingival, junctional, and sulcular epithelium. These three types form from a mass of epithelial cells known as the epithelial cuff between the tooth and the mouth. The gingival epithelium is not associated directly with tooth attachment and is visible in the mouth. The junctional epithelium, composed of the basal lamina and hemidesmosomes, forms an attachment to the tooth. The sulcular epithelium is nonkeratinized stratified squamous tissue on the gingiva which touches but is not attached to the tooth.

== Tooth decay ==
=== Plaque ===
Plaque is a biofilm consisting of large quantities of various bacteria that form on teeth. If not removed regularly, plaque buildup can lead to periodontal problems such as gingivitis. Given time, plaque can mineralize along the gingiva, forming tartar. The microorganisms that form the biofilm are almost entirely bacteria (mainly streptococcus and anaerobes), with the composition varying by location in the mouth. Streptococcus mutans is the most important bacterium associated with dental caries.

Certain bacteria in the mouth live off the remains of foods, especially sugars and starches. In the absence of oxygen they produce lactic acid, which dissolves the calcium and phosphorus in the enamel. This process, known as "demineralisation", leads to tooth destruction. Saliva gradually neutralises the acids, which causes the pH of the tooth surface to rise above the critical pH, typically considered to be 5.5. This causes remineralisation, the return of the dissolved minerals to the enamel. If there is sufficient time between the intake of foods then the impact is limited and the teeth can repair themselves. Saliva is unable to penetrate through plaque, however, to neutralize the acid produced by the bacteria.

=== Caries (cavities) ===
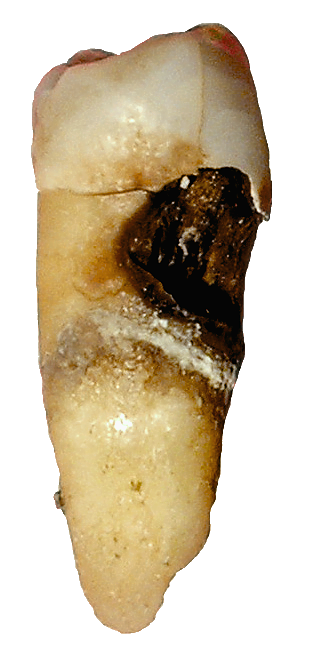
Advanced tooth decay on a premolar

Dental caries (cavities), described as "tooth decay", is an infectious disease which damages the structures of teeth. The disease can lead to pain, tooth loss, and infection. Dental caries has a long history, with evidence showing the disease was present in the Bronze Age, Iron Age, and Middle Ages but also prior to the Neolithic period. The largest increases in the prevalence of caries have been associated with diet changes. Today, caries remains one of the most common diseases throughout the world. In the United States, dental caries is the most common chronic childhood disease, being at least five times more common than asthma. Countries that have experienced an overall decrease in cases of tooth decay continue to have a disparity in the distribution of the disease. Among children in the United States and Europe, 60–80% of cases of dental caries occur in 20% of the population.

Tooth decay is caused by certain types of acid-producing bacteria which cause the most damage in the presence of fermentable carbohydrates such as sucrose, fructose, and glucose. The resulting acidic levels in the mouth affect teeth because a tooth's special mineral content causes it to be sensitive to low pH. Depending on the extent of tooth destruction, various treatments can be used to restore teeth to proper form, function, and aesthetics, but there is no known method to regenerate large amounts of tooth structure. Instead, dental health organizations advocate preventive and prophylactic measures, such as regular oral hygiene and dietary modifications, to avoid dental caries.

== Tooth care ==
=== Oral hygiene ===
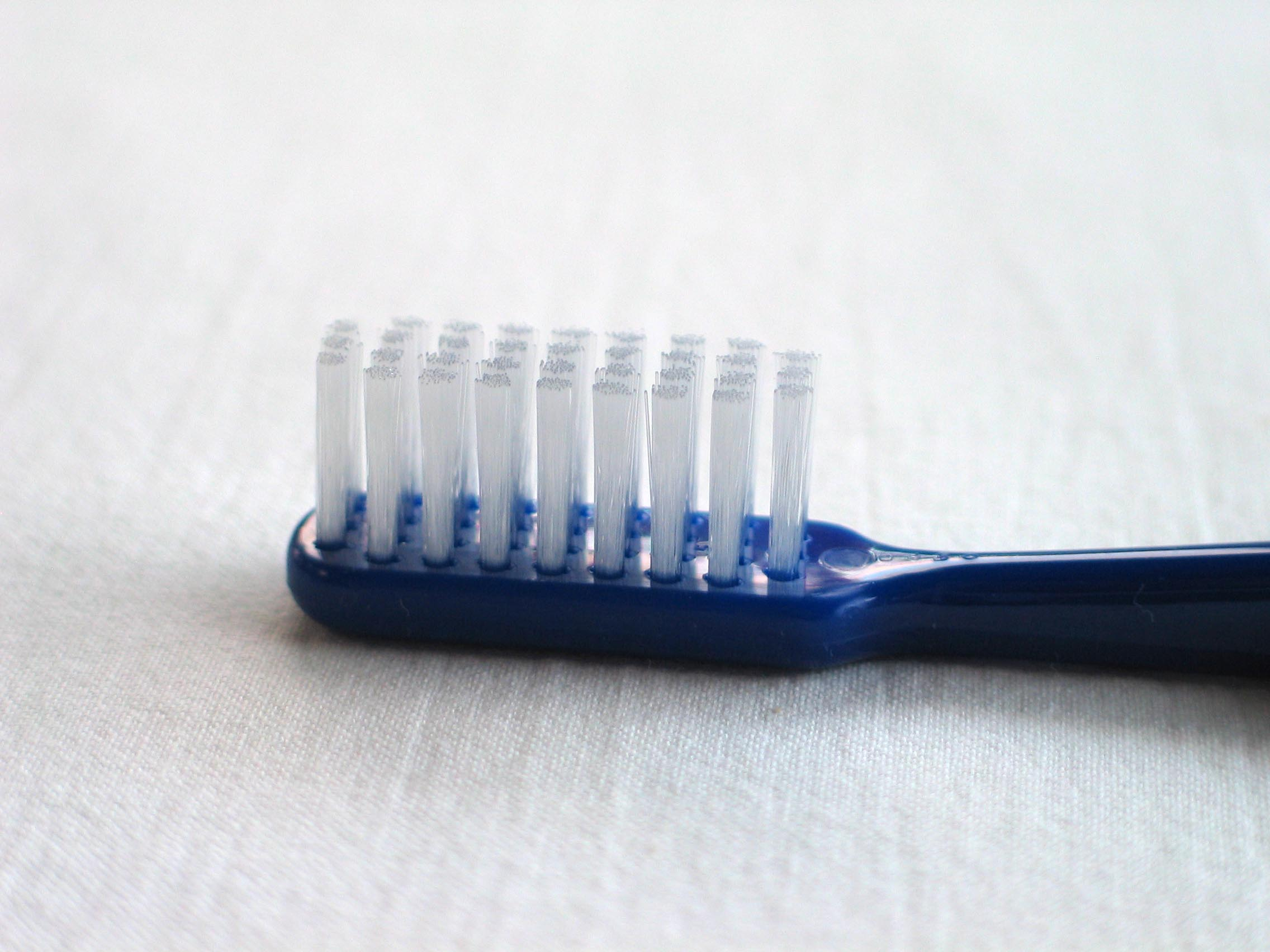
Toothbrushes are commonly used to help clean teeth.

Oral hygiene is the practice of keeping the mouth clean and is a means of preventing dental caries, gingivitis, periodontal disease, bad breath, and other dental disorders. It consists of both professional and personal care. Regular cleanings, usually done by dentists and dental hygienists, remove tartar (mineralized plaque) that may develop even with careful brushing and flossing. Professional cleaning includes tooth scaling, using various instruments or devices to loosen and remove deposits from teeth.

The purpose of cleaning teeth is to remove plaque, which consists mostly of bacteria. Healthcare professionals recommend regular brushing twice a day (in the morning and in the evening, or after meals) in order to prevent formation of plaque and tartar. A toothbrush is able to remove most plaque, except in areas between teeth. As a result, flossing is also considered a necessity to maintain oral hygiene. When used correctly, dental floss removes plaque from between teeth and at the gum line, where periodontal disease often begins and could develop caries.

Electric toothbrushes are a popular aid to oral hygiene. A user without disabilities, with proper training in manual brushing, and with good motivation, can achieve standards of oral hygiene at least as satisfactory as the best electric brushes, but untrained users rarely achieve anything of the kind. Not all electric toothbrushes are equally effective and even a good design needs to be used properly for best effect, but: "Electric toothbrushes tend to help people who are not as good at cleaning teeth and as a result have had oral hygiene problems." The most important advantage of electric toothbrushes is their ability to aid people with dexterity difficulties, such as those associated with rheumatoid arthritis.

=== Protective treatments ===
Fluoride therapy is often recommended to protect against dental caries. Water fluoridation and fluoride supplements decrease the incidence of dental caries. Fluoride helps prevent dental decay by binding to the hydroxyapatite crystals in enamel. The incorporated fluoride makes enamel more resistant to demineralization and thus more resistant to decay. Topical fluoride, such as a fluoride toothpaste or mouthwash, is also recommended to protect teeth surfaces. Many dentists include application of topical fluoride solutions as part of routine cleanings.

Dental sealants are another preventive therapy often used to provide a barrier to bacteria and decay on the surface of teeth. Sealants can last up to ten years and are primarily used on the biting surfaces of molars of children and young adults, especially those who may have difficulty brushing and flossing effectively. Sealants are applied in a dentist's office, sometimes by a dental hygienist, in a procedure similar in technique and cost to a fluoride application.

== Restorations ==
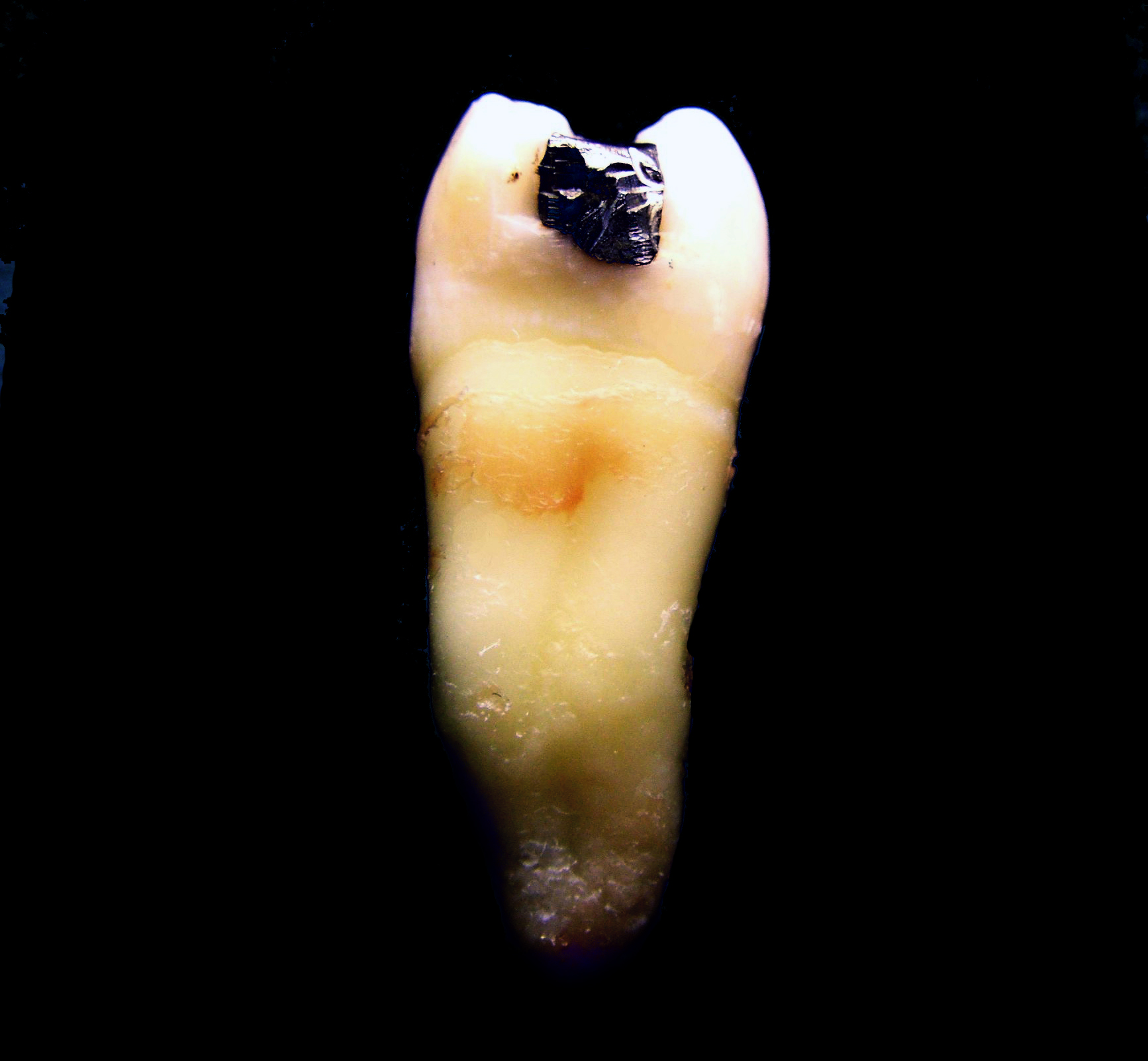
A restored premolar

After a tooth has been damaged or destroyed, restoration of the missing structure can be achieved with a variety of treatments. Restorations may be created from a variety of materials, including glass ionomer, amalgam, gold, porcelain, and composite. Small restorations placed inside a tooth are referred to as "intracoronal restorations". These restorations may be formed directly in the mouth or may be cast using the lost-wax technique, such as for some inlays and onlays. When larger portions of a tooth are lost, an "extracoronal restoration" may be fabricated, such as an artificial crown or a veneer, to restore the involved tooth.

When a tooth is lost, dentures, bridges, or implants may be used as replacements. Dentures are usually the least costly whereas implants are usually the most expensive. Dentures may replace complete arches of the mouth or only a partial number of teeth. Bridges replace smaller spaces of missing teeth and use adjacent teeth to support the restoration. Dental implants may be used to replace a single tooth or a series of teeth. Though implants are the most expensive treatment option, they are often the most desirable restoration because of their aesthetics and function. To improve the function of dentures, implants may be used as support.

== Abnormalities ==
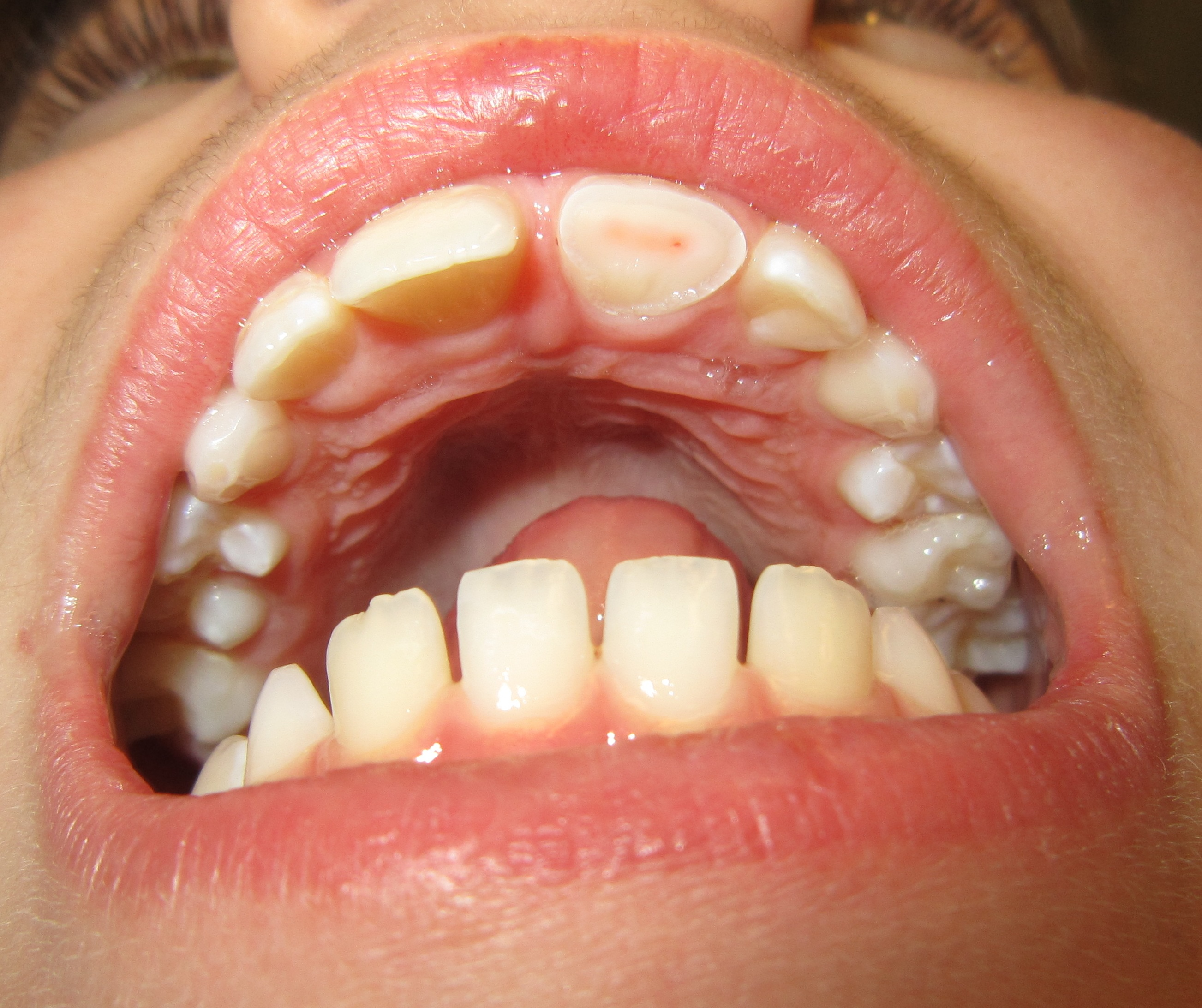
A broken upper front tooth showing the pink of the pulp

Tooth abnormalities may be categorized according to whether they have environmental or developmental causes. While environmental abnormalities may appear to have an obvious cause, there may not appear to be any known cause for some developmental abnormalities. Environmental forces may affect teeth during development, destroy tooth structure after development, discolor teeth at any stage of development, or alter the course of tooth eruption. Developmental abnormalities most commonly affect the number, size, shape, and structure of teeth.

=== Environmental ===
==== Alteration during tooth development ====
Tooth abnormalities caused by environmental factors during tooth development have long-lasting effects. Enamel and dentin do not regenerate after they mineralize initially. Enamel hypoplasia is a condition in which the amount of enamel formed is inadequate. This results either in pits and grooves in areas of the tooth or in widespread absence of enamel. Diffuse opacities of enamel does not affect the amount of enamel but changes its appearance. Affected enamel has a different translucency than the rest of the tooth. Demarcated opacities of enamel have sharp boundaries where the translucency decreases and manifest a white, cream, yellow, or brown color. All these may be caused by nutritional factors, an exanthematous disease (chicken pox, congenital syphilis), undiagnosed and untreated celiac disease, hypocalcemia, dental fluorosis, birth injury, preterm birth, infection or trauma from a deciduous tooth. Dental fluorosis is a condition which results from ingesting excessive amounts of fluoride and leads to teeth which are spotted, yellow, brown, black or sometimes pitted. In most cases, the enamel defects caused by celiac disease, which may be the only manifestation of this disease in the absence of any other symptoms or signs, are not recognized and mistakenly attributed to other causes, such as fluorosis. Enamel hypoplasia resulting from syphilis is frequently referred to as Hutchinson's teeth, which is considered one part of Hutchinson's triad. Turner's hypoplasia is a portion of missing or diminished enamel on a permanent tooth usually from a prior infection of a nearby primary tooth. Hypoplasia may also result from antineoplastic therapy.

==== Destruction after development ====
Tooth destruction from processes other than dental caries is considered a normal physiologic process but may become severe enough to become a pathologic condition. Attrition is the loss of tooth structure by mechanical forces from opposing teeth. Attrition initially affects the enamel and, if unchecked, may proceed to the underlying dentin. Abrasion is the loss of tooth structure by mechanical forces from a foreign element. If this force begins at the cementoenamel junction, then progression of tooth loss can be rapid since enamel is very thin in this region of the tooth. A common source of this type of tooth wear is excessive force when using a toothbrush. Erosion is the loss of tooth structure due to chemical dissolution by acids not of bacterial origin. Signs of tooth destruction from erosion is a common characteristic in the mouths of people with bulimia since vomiting results in exposure of the teeth to gastric acids. Another important source of erosive acids are from frequent sucking of lemon juice. Abfraction is the loss of tooth structure from flexural forces. As teeth flex under pressure, the arrangement of teeth touching each other, known as occlusion, causes tension on one side of the tooth and compression on the other side of the tooth. This is believed to cause V-shaped depressions on the side under tension and C-shaped depressions on the side under compression. When tooth destruction occurs at the roots of teeth, the process is referred to as internal resorption, when caused by cells within the pulp, or external resorption, when caused by cells in the periodontal ligament.

==== Discoloration ====
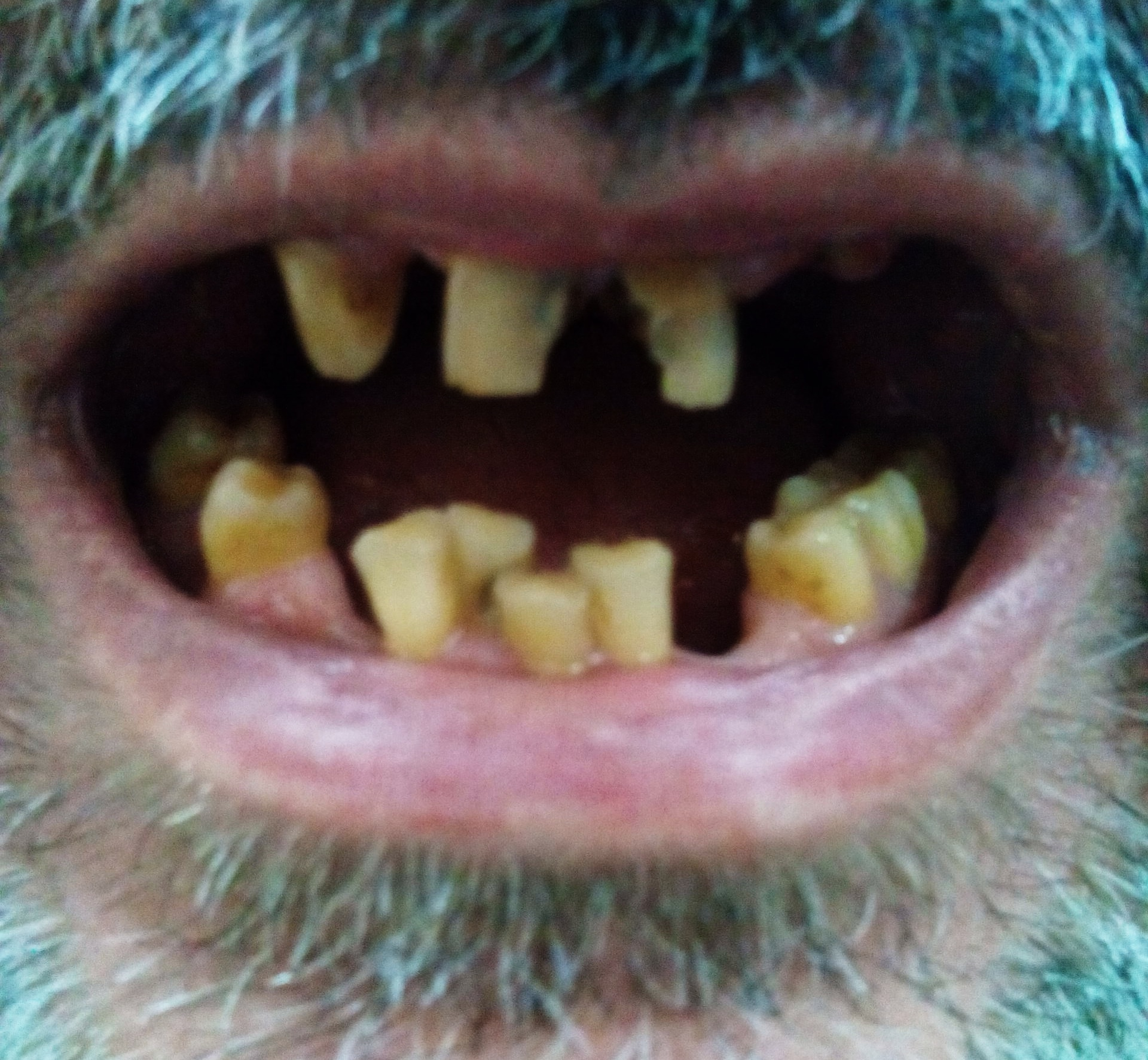
Discolored teeth

Discoloration of teeth may result from bacteria stains, tobacco, tea, coffee, foods with an abundance of chlorophyll, restorative materials, and medications. Stains from bacteria may cause colors varying from green to black to orange. Green stains also result from foods with chlorophyll or excessive exposure to copper or nickel. Amalgam, a common dental restorative material, may turn adjacent areas of teeth black or gray. Long term use of chlorhexidine, a mouthwash, may encourage extrinsic stain formation near the gingiva on teeth. This is usually easy for a hygienist to remove. Systemic disorders also can cause tooth discoloration. Congenital erythropoietic porphyria causes porphyrins to be deposited in teeth, causing a red-brown coloration. Blue discoloration may occur with alkaptonuria and rarely with Parkinson's disease. Erythroblastosis fetalis and biliary atresia are diseases which may cause teeth to appear green from the deposition of biliverdin. Also, trauma may change a tooth to a pink, yellow, or dark gray color. Pink and red discolorations are also associated in patients with lepromatous leprosy. Some medications, such as tetracycline antibiotics, may become incorporated into the structure of a tooth, causing intrinsic staining of the teeth.

==== Alteration of eruption ====
Tooth eruption may be altered by some environmental factors. When eruption is prematurely stopped, the tooth is said to be impacted. The most common cause of tooth impaction is lack of space in the mouth for the tooth. Other causes may be tumors, cysts, trauma, and thickened bone or soft tissue. Tooth ankylosis occurs when the tooth has already erupted into the mouth but the cementum or dentin has fused with the alveolar bone. This may cause a person to retain their primary tooth instead of having it replaced by a permanent one.

A technique for altering the natural progression of eruption is employed by orthodontists who wish to delay or speed up the eruption of certain teeth for reasons of space maintenance or otherwise preventing crowding and/or spacing. If a primary tooth is extracted before its succeeding permanent tooth's root reaches 1/3 of its total growth, the eruption of the permanent tooth will be delayed. Conversely, if the roots of the permanent tooth are more than 2/3 complete, the eruption of the permanent tooth will be accelerated. Between 1/3 and 2/3, it is unknown exactly what will occur to the speed of eruption.

=== Developmental ===
==== Abnormality in number ====
- Anodontia is the total lack of tooth development.
- Hyperdontia is the presence of a higher-than-normal number of teeth.
- Hypodontia is the lack of development of one or more teeth.
  - Oligodontia may be used to describe the absence of 6 or more teeth.

Some systemic disorders which may result in hyperdontia include Apert syndrome, cleidocranial dysostosis, Crouzon syndrome, Ehlers–Danlos syndrome, Gardner's syndrome, and Sturge–Weber syndrome. Some systemic disorders which may result in hypodontia include Crouzon syndrome, Ectodermal dysplasia, Ehlers–Danlos syndrome, and Gorlin syndrome.

==== Abnormality in size ====
- Microdontia is a condition where teeth are smaller than the usual size.
- Macrodontia is where teeth are larger than the usual size.

Microdontia of a single tooth is more likely to occur in a maxillary lateral incisor. The second most likely tooth to have microdontia are third molars. Macrodontia of all the teeth is known to occur in pituitary gigantism and pineal hyperplasia. It may also occur on one side of the face in cases of hemifacial hyperplasia.

==== Abnormality in shape ====
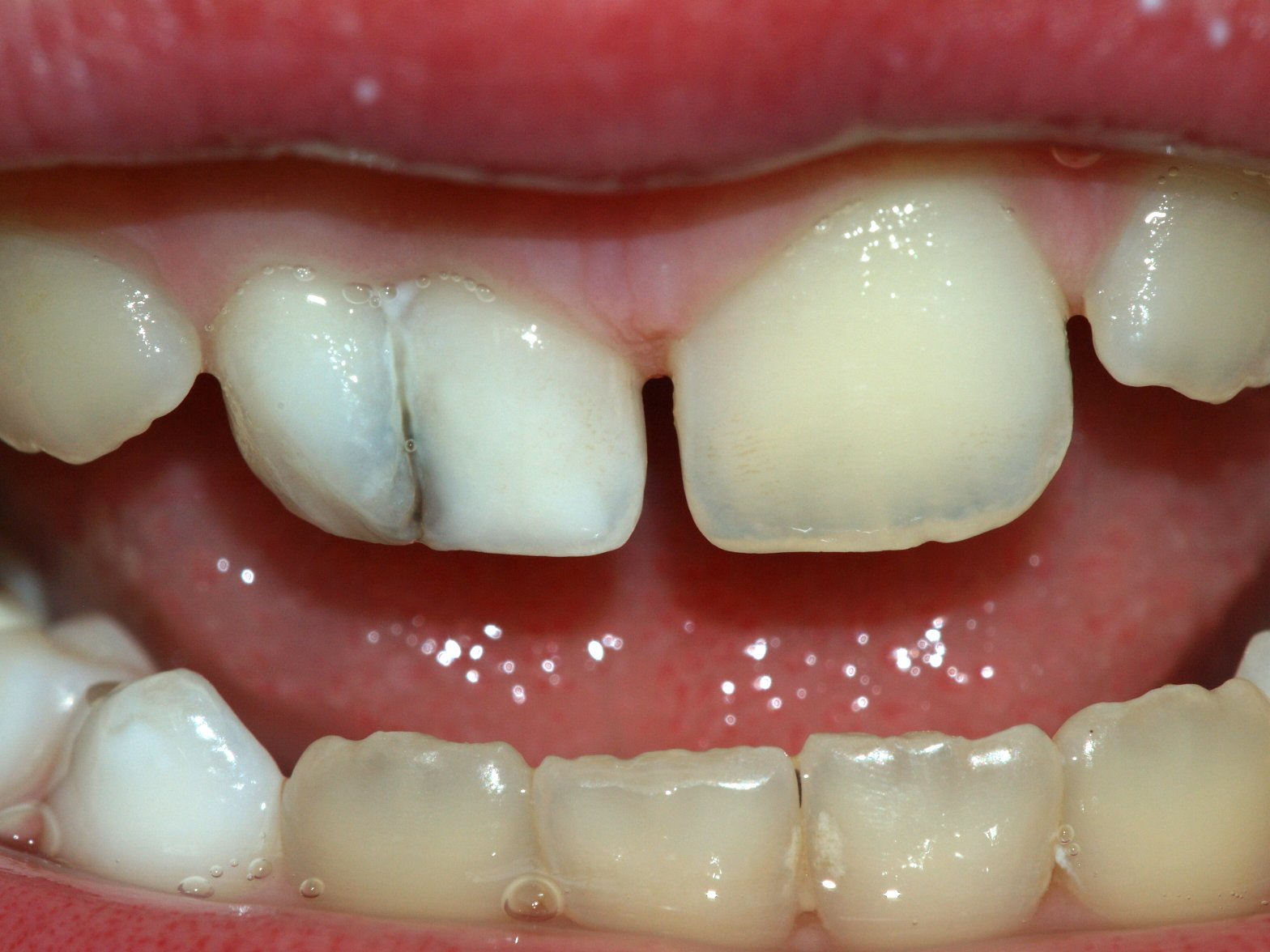
The fusion of two deciduous teeth

- Gemination occurs when a developing tooth incompletely splits into the formation of two teeth.
- Fusion is the union of two adjacent teeth during development.
- Concrescence is the fusion of two separate teeth only in their cementum.
- Accessory cusps are additional cusps on a tooth and may manifest as a Talon cusp, Cusp of Carabelli, or Dens evaginatus.
- Dens invaginatus, also called Dens in dente, is a deep invagination in a tooth causing the appearance of a tooth within a tooth.
- Ectopic enamel is enamel found in an unusual location, such as the root of a tooth.
- Taurodontism is a condition where the body of the tooth and pulp chamber is enlarged, and is associated with Klinefelter syndrome, Tricho-dento-osseous syndrome, Triple X syndrome, and XYY syndrome.
- Hypercementosis is excessive formation of cementum, which may result from trauma, inflammation, acromegaly, rheumatic fever, and Paget's disease of bone.
- A dilaceration is a bend in the root which may have been caused by trauma to the tooth during formation.
- Supernumerary roots is the presence of a greater number of roots on a tooth than expected

==== Cleft lip and palate and their association with dental anomalies ====
There are many types of dental anomalies seen in cleft lip and palate (CLP) patients. Both sets of dentition may be affected; however, they are commonly seen in the affected side. Most frequently, missing teeth, supernumerary or discoloured teeth can be seen; however, enamel dysplasia, discolouration and delayed root development are also common. In children with cleft lip and palate, the lateral incisor in the alveolar cleft region has the highest prevalence of dental developmental disorders; this condition may be a cause of tooth crowding. This is important to consider in order to correctly plan treatment keeping in mind considerations for function and aesthetics. By correctly coordinating management invasive treatment procedures can be prevented resulting in successful and conservative treatment.

There have been a plethora of research studies to calculate prevalence of certain dental anomalies in CLP populations however a variety of results have been obtained.

In a study evaluating dental anomalies in Brazilian cleft patients, male patients had a higher incidence of CLP, agenesis, and supernumerary teeth than did female patients. In cases of complete CLP, the left maxillary lateral incisor was the most commonly absent tooth. Supernumerary teeth were typically located distal to the cleft. In a study of Jordanian subjects, the prevalence of dental anomaly was higher in CLP patients than in normal subjects. Missing teeth were observed in 66.7% of patients, with maxillary lateral incisor as the most frequently affected tooth. Supernumerary teeth were observed in 16.7% of patients; other findings included microdontia (37%), taurodontism (70.5%), transposition or ectopic teeth (30.8%), dilacerations (19.2%), and hypoplasia (30.8%). The incidence of microdontia, dilaceration, and hypoplasia was significantly higher in bilateral CLP patients than in unilateral CLP patients, and none of the anomalies showed any significant sexual dimorphism.

It is therefore evident that patients with cleft lip and palate may present with a variety of dental anomalies. It is essential to assess the patient both clinically and radiographically in order to correctly treat and prevent progression of any dental problems. It is also useful to note that patients with a cleft lip and palate automatically score a 5 on the IOTN ( index for orthodontic need) and therefore are eligible for orthodontic treatment, liaising with an orthodontist is vital in order coordinate and plan treatment successfully.

==== Abnormality in structure ====
- Amelogenesis imperfecta is a condition in which enamel does not form properly or at all.
- Dentinogenesis imperfecta is a condition in which dentin does not form properly and is sometimes associated with osteogenesis imperfecta.
- Dentin dysplasia is a disorder in which the roots and pulp of teeth may be affected.
- Regional odontodysplasia is a disorder affecting enamel, dentin, and pulp and causes the teeth to appear "ghostly" on radiographs.
- Diastema is a condition in which there is a gap between two teeth caused by the imbalance in the relationship between the jaw and the size of teeth.

== See also ==
- Barodontalgia
- Dentistry
- Dental auxiliary
  - Dental assistant
  - Dental hygienist
  - Dental technician
- Dental braces
- Dental notation
- Dental tourism
- Growing teeth
- Head and neck anatomy
- Regenerative endodontics
- Socket preservation
- Tongue
- Tooth fairy
- Tooth painting
- Tooth regeneration

=== Lists ===
- List of basic dentistry topics
- List of oral health and dental topics
