= Axillary =

Axillary means "related to the axilla (armpit)" or "related to the leaf axils".

"Axillary" may refer to:

== Biology ==
- Axillary artery
- Axillary border
- Axillary fascia
- Axillary feathers
- Axillary hairs
- Axillary lines
- Axillary lymph nodes
- Axillary nerve
- Axillary process
- Axillary sheath
- Axillary space
- Axillary tail
- Axillary vein
- Axillary (botany), of a flower or other structure found in a leaf axil

== See also ==
- Auxiliary (disambiguation)
- Maxillary (disambiguation)
