= Auxiliary =

Auxiliary may refer to:

== In language ==
- Auxiliary language (disambiguation)
- Auxiliary verb

== In military and law enforcement ==
- Auxiliary police
- Auxiliaries, civilians or quasi-military personnel who provide support of some kind to a military service
  - Auxiliaries (Roman military)

== In religion ==
- Auxiliary bishop, in the Roman Catholic Church
- Auxiliary organization (LDS Church)

== In technology ==
- Auxiliary input jack and auxiliary cable, generally for audio
  - frequently associated with mobile device audio
- Aux-send of a mixing console
- An auxiliary port is a common port found on many Cisco routers for CLI access.
- A backup site or system
- Ancillary services in electric power

== Other uses ==
- Auxiliary route, also known as "special route", in road transportation
  - An auxiliary route of the Interstate Highway System in the United States
- Auxiliary ship is a naval vessel designed to operate in support of combat ships and other naval operations
- Auxiliary (fraternity or sorority)
- A marching band color guard
- Auxiliary percussion
- "Auxiliary", a song by Benjamin Clementine from And I Have Been, 2022
- Auxiliary services corporation, a public benefit corporation that provides food services, bookstore, computer services, residence hall services, and similar programs to a college or university

== See also ==
- Aux (disambiguation)
- Axillary (disambiguation)
