= Myrtis (disambiguation) =

Myrtis is the name given to an ancient Greek girl, whose remains were unearthed in 1994–1995.

Myrtis may also refer to:

- Myrtis of Anthedon (fl. 6th century BCE), ancient Greek poet
- Myrtis (bird), a monotypic genus of hummingbird, the purple-collared woodstar
