= Plague of Athens =

430 BC epidemic in Greece

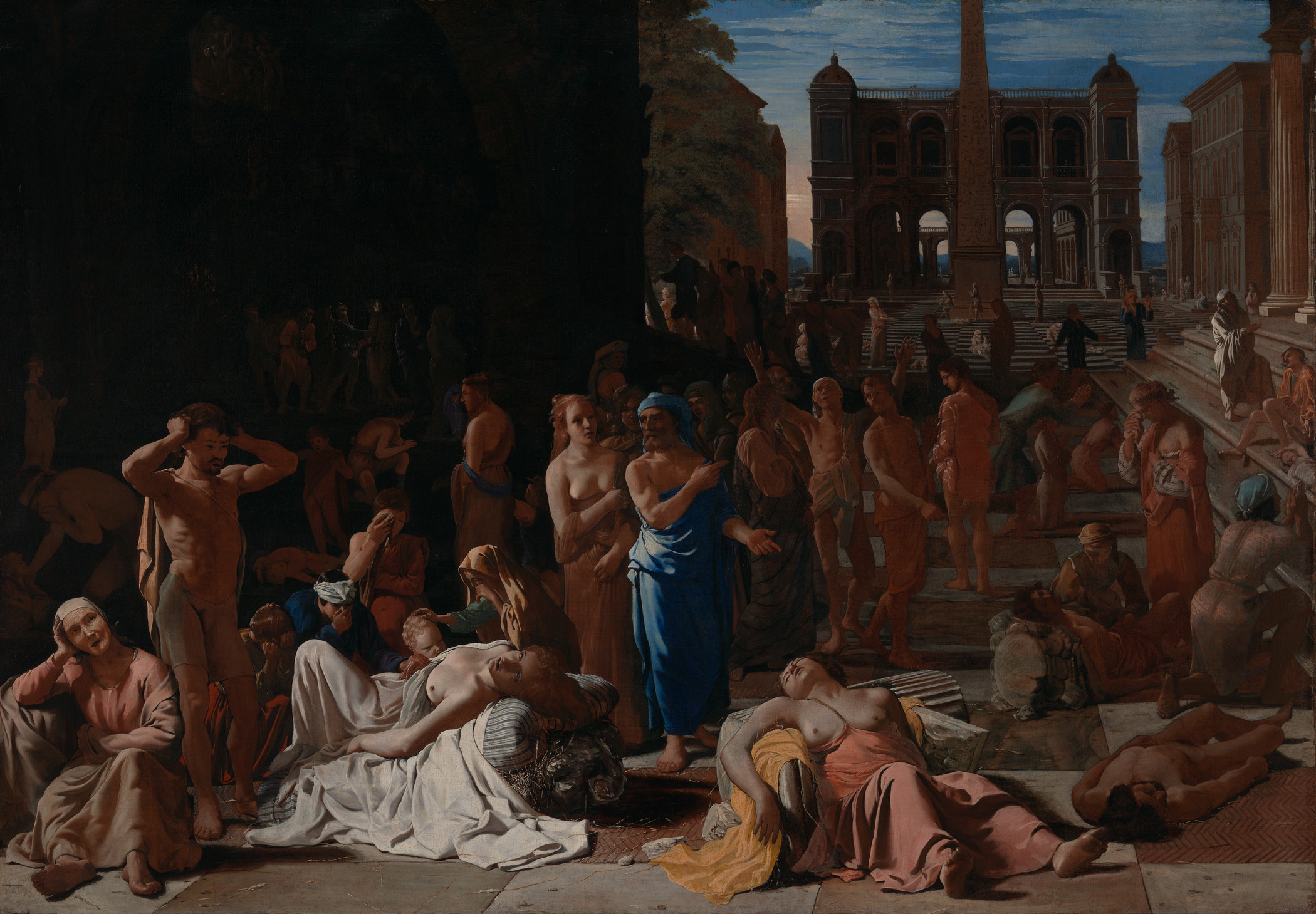
- Plague in an Ancient City, Michiel Sweerts, c. 1652–1654
- Disease: Unknown, possibly typhoid fever
- Location: Greece
- Date: 430–426 BC
- Deaths: 75,000–100,000

The Plague of Athens (Ancient Greek: Λοιμὸς τῶν Ἀθηνῶν, Loimos tôn Athênôn) was an epidemic that devastated the city-state of Athens in ancient Greece during the second year (430 BC) of the Peloponnesian War when an Athenian victory still seemed within reach. The plague killed an estimated 75,000 to 100,000 people, around 25% of the population, and is believed to have entered Athens through Piraeus, the city's port and sole source of food and supplies. Thucydides, an Athenian survivor, wrote that much of the eastern Mediterranean also saw an outbreak of the disease, albeit with less impact.

The war, along with the plague, had lasting effects on Athenian society. Short-term, there was civil disorder, and violations of usual funerary practices. Thucydides describes a decrease in traditional religious practices and increase in superstitious explanations. He estimates that it took 15 years for the Athenian population to recover. Long-term, the high death toll drastically redistributed wealth within Athenian society, and weakened Athens politically.

The plague returned in 429, and a third time in the winter of 427/426 BC. Thucydides left a detailed account of the plague's symptoms and epidemiology. Some 30 pathogens have been suggested as having caused the plague.

== Background ==
Sparta and its allies, except for Corinth, were almost exclusively land-based powers, able to summon large land armies that were very nearly unbeatable. In the face of a combined campaign on land from Sparta and its allies beginning in 431 BC, the Athenians, under the direction of Pericles, pursued a policy of retreat within the city walls of Athens, relying on Athenian maritime supremacy for supply while the superior Athenian navy harassed Spartan troop movements. Unfortunately, the strategy also resulted in massive migration from the Attic countryside into an already highly populated city, generating overpopulation and resource shortage. Due to the close quarters and poor hygiene exhibited at that time, Athens became a breeding ground for disease, and many citizens died. In the history of epidemics in wartime, the 'Plague' of Athens is remarkable for the limitation of the affliction to one side as well as for its influence on the outcome of the war. The Athenians thought that the Spartans could have poisoned their water supply to kill them to win the Peloponnesian War. The Spartans somehow were unaffected by the plague, which may have been a reason for the Athenians' suspicion. It has been noted that the Plague of Athens was the worst sickness of Classical Greece.

In his History of the Peloponnesian War, the historian Thucydides, who was present and contracted the disease himself and survived, describes the epidemic. He writes of a disease coming from Ethiopia and passing through Egypt and Libya into the Greek world and spreading throughout the wider Mediterranean; a plague so severe and deadly that no one could recall anywhere its like, and physicians ignorant of its nature not only were helpless but themselves died the fastest, having had the most contact with the sick. In overcrowded Athens, the disease killed an estimated 25% of the population. The sight of the burning funeral pyres of Athens caused the Spartans to withdraw their troops, being unwilling to risk contact with the diseased enemy. Many of Athens' infantry and expert seamen died. According to Thucydides, not until 415 BC had Athens recovered sufficiently to mount a major offensive, the disastrous Sicilian Expedition.

The first corroboration of the plague was not revealed until 1994-95 when excavation revealed the first mass grave. Upon this discovery, Thucydides' accounts of the event as well as analysis of the remains was used to try to identify the cause of the epidemic.

== Epidemiology ==
There was severe overcrowding due to the ongoing war. During this time, refugees from the Peloponnesian War had immigrated within the Long Walls of Athens, inflating the populations of Athens, the port of Piraeus, and the area along the road between them, which was also within the Long Walls. The population had tripled or quadrupled, from a prewar population of around 100–150,000 (60,000 citizens, 25,000 metics and no more than 70,000 slaves) to 300–400,000. This gave a population density of 25,000 inhabitants per square mile (9,700/km^{2}) to 100,000 inhabitants per square mile (39,000/km^{2}).

Athenians tried to reduce the effects of this overcrowding by moving the cattle to Euboea; as the disease spread, there were also official and unofficial quarantines.

Thucydides says that the plague spread from Ethiopia to Athens, and that the plague first emerged in the port of Piraeus, from ships with plague-infected passengers, whence it spread to Athens via the Long Walls, where refugees would camp out. He says that crowding and poor hygiene in the Long Walls led to a significant spread of the plague.

The plague affected certain groups over others; however, there are few demographic details of how the plague spread. Physicians and health care workers were at a higher risk to catch the plague due to the exposure of other diseases. Higher-ranking members of society were at a lower risk of catching the plague due to better living standards and better hygiene. Lack of food was not an issue for Athens, for they had plenty of grain storage. Athens lacked vitamin C due to their mainly grain diet. The lack of vitamin C caused a lower immunity. The lower immunity left Athenians more susceptible to diseases. The Plague of Athens was most likely caused by a reservoir disease or respiratory disease, though neither has been confirmed. If the plague was caused by a reservoir disease, it would be very similar to arboviral diseases or typhus as is later mentioned. If it was a respiratory disease, it would most likely be similar to smallpox.

Most Athenian doctors and physicians believed in humorism. The belief was centered around the idea that a person contains four humors–yellow bile, black bile, phlegm, and blood–that needed to be equally balanced to have a healthy body. Practices to balance the humors include blood-letting, purging, urine sampling, and using the opposite humor to treat the imbalanced humor.

== Social implications ==
Accounts of the Athenian plague graphically describe the social consequences of an epidemic. Thucydides describes a disappearance of social morals during the time of the plague:

"The catastrophe was so overwhelming that men, not knowing what would happen next to them, became indifferent to every rule of religion or law.”

— Thucydides, History of the Peloponnesian War

The perceived impact of the Athenian plague on collective social and religious behavior echoes accounts of the medieval pandemic best known as the Black Death, although scholars have disputed its objective veracity in both instances, citing a historical link between epidemic disease and unsubstantiated moral panic that bordered on hysteria.

=== Fear of the law ===
Thucydides states that people ceased fearing the law since they felt they were already living under a death sentence. Likewise, people started spending money indiscriminately. Many felt they would not live long enough to enjoy the fruits of wise investment, while some of the poor unexpectedly became wealthy by inheriting the property of their relatives. He also wrote that people refused to behave honorably because most did not expect to live long enough to enjoy a good reputation for it.

=== Care for the sick and dead ===
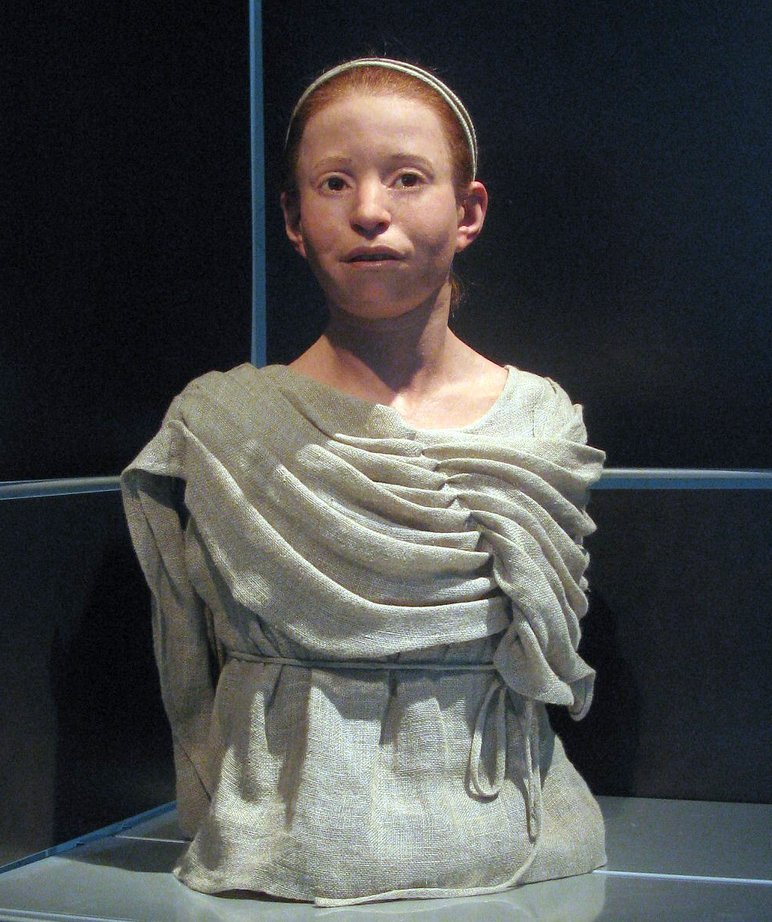
Α reconstructed appearance of Myrtis, an 11-year-old girl who died during the plague of Athens and whose skeleton was found in the Kerameikos mass grave, National Archaeological Museum of Athens

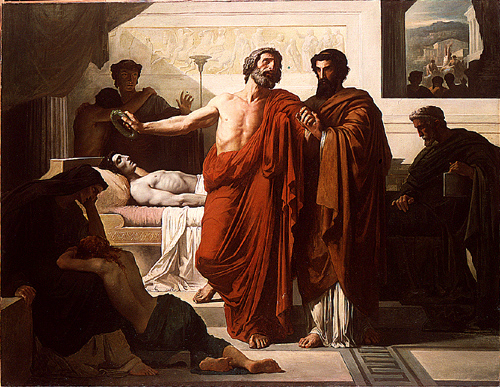
Pericles witnessing the death of his son due to the Plague of Athens, by François Chifflart

Thucydides also describes violations of social norms motivated by the sheer contagiousness of the illness. For instance, he says that those who tended to the ill were most vulnerable to catching the disease, which meant that many people died alone because no one was willing to risk caring for them. The dead were heaped on top of each other, left to rot, or shoved into mass graves. Sometimes those carrying the dead would come across an already burning funeral pyre, dump a new body on it, and walk away. Others appropriated prepared pyres to have enough fuel to cremate their own dead. Survivors of the plague, like Thucydides himself, developed an immunity, and so became the main caretakers of those who later fell ill. According to Thucydides, those who had become ill and survived were the most sympathetic to others suffering: believing that they could no longer succumb to any illness, many survivors offered to assist with the remaining sick.

Thucydides' description has archeological support. A mass grave and nearly 1,000 tombs, dated between 430 and 426 BC, have been found just outside Athens' ancient Kerameikos cemetery. The mass grave was bordered by a low wall that seemed to have protected the cemetery from a wetland. Excavated during 1994–95, the shaft-shaped grave may have contained a total of 240 individuals, at least ten of them children. Skeletons in the graves were randomly placed with no layers of soil between them. The earliest (lowest) burials were carefully laid out and included pot burials; for the later burials, the bodies appear to have been simply tossed into the grave, with the exception of pot burials of the bodies of children and infants.

The site was hastily excavated as it was bulldozed for the Kerameikos metro station and subway line, both subsequently cancelled. Excavator Efi Baziotopoulou-Valavani, of the Third Ephoreia (Directorate) of Antiquities, reported that "[t]he mass grave did not have a monumental character. The offerings we found consisted of common, even cheap, burial vessels; black-finished ones, some small red-figured, as well as white lekythoi (oil flasks) of the second half of the 5th century BC. The bodies were placed in the pit within a day or two. These [factors] point to a mass burial in a state of panic, quite possibly due to a plague."

=== Religious strife ===
The plague also caused religious uncertainty and doubt. Thucydides wrote that since the disease struck without regard to a person's piety toward the gods, people felt abandoned by the gods and there seemed to be no benefit to worshiping them. He described the temples themselves as sites of great misery, as refugees from the Athenian countryside had been forced to find accommodation in the temples, and says that the sacred buildings were soon filled with the dead and dying.

Thucydides says that many of his fellow Athenians took the plague as evidence that the gods favored Sparta, citing an oracle that Apollo himself (the god of disease and medicine) would fight for Sparta if they fought with all their might, and an earlier oracle that had warned that "A Dorian [Spartan] war will come, and bring a pestilence with it". Thucydides was skeptical of these conclusions and believed that people were simply being superstitious. He relied upon the prevailing medical theory of the day, Hippocratic theory, and strove to gather evidence through direct observation. He observed that carrion-eating birds and animals disappeared, though he left it an open question whether they died after eating the corpses or refused to eat them and were driven away:

All the birds and beasts that prey upon human bodies, either abstained from touching them (though there were many lying unburied), or died after tasting them. In proof of this, it was noticed that birds of this kind disappeared; they were not about the bodies, or indeed to be seen at all.

=== Aftermath ===
The plague was an unforeseen event that resulted in one of the largest recorded losses of life in ancient Greece as well as a breakdown of Athenian society. The epidemic caused the death of an estimated 25% of Athens, which at the time ranged from 250,000 to 300,000. Thucydides says that it took 15 years for the Athenian population to recover. The plague also contributed to Athens' overall loss of power and need to expand.

Thucydides says that the balance of power between citizens had changed due to many of the rich dying and their fortunes being inherited by remaining relatives of the lower classes. Thucydides, being a wealthy citizen, does not document much about the effects on lower classes.

It is speculated that the ratio of metics to citizens changed (in 450, metics were probably between a fifth and a half of the Athenian population). The Plague may have made the legal and social position of metics more precarious, though this trend was obvious before the Plague, in the 490s and 480s, as a reaction to the refugees of the Persian war. The Citizenship Law of Pericles, passed before the Plague in 451/450, stated that only those born to two Athenian parents could be considered an Athenian citizen; it was re-enacted in 402, the year after the war ended, well after the Plague. The reduction in citizen population reduced both their number of potential soldiers and amount of political power Athens could wield. Many of the remaining Athenians were found to be metics who had forged their documentation or had bribed officials to hide their original status. A number of these people were reduced to slaves once they were caught.

The plague dealt massive damage to Athens two years into the Peloponnesian War, from which it never recovered. Their political strength had weakened, and morale among their armies and citizens had fallen significantly. Athens would then go on to be defeated by Sparta and fall from being a major power in Ancient Greece.

Pericles, a leading Athenian statesman, is said by Plutarch (writing over four centuries later) to have died in the 429 plague; Thucydides (a contemporary and strong supporter of Pericles) does not mention this death.

== Symptoms ==
Thucydides left a detailed account of what victims of the plague experienced, in order to "describe what it was like, and set down the symptoms, knowledge of which will enable it to be recognized, if it should ever break out again." He says that the illness began by showing symptoms in the head as it worked its way through the rest of the body. He describes:

- Fever
- Redness and inflammation in the eyes
- Sore throats leading to bleeding and bad breath
- Sneezing
- Loss of voice
- Coughing
- Vomiting
- Pustules and ulcers on the body
- Extreme thirst
- Insomnia
- Diarrhea
- Convulsions
- Gangrene

Thucydides described the afflicted as having a lively complexion leaning towards red, with frequent breakouts of pustules and ulcers. According to his account, though plague sufferers were not hot to the touch, their fever must have been intense, as they could not bear even very thin linen garments; they insisted on being naked and longed for nothing more than to throw themselves into cold water. Patients sometimes drank far too little or far too much water, and were exhausted by violent urinations and diarrhea.

== Possible causes ==
Historians have long tried to identify the disease behind the Plague of Athens. The disease has traditionally been considered an outbreak of the bubonic plague in its many forms, but a reconsideration of the reported symptoms and epidemiology have led scholars to advance alternative explanations: these include typhus, smallpox, measles, and toxic shock syndrome. Based upon striking descriptive similarities with recent outbreaks in Africa, as well as the fact that the Athenian plague itself came from Africa (as Thucydides recorded), Ebola or a related viral hemorrhagic fever has been considered.

Given the possibility that profiles of a known disease may have changed over time, or that the plague was caused by a disease that no longer exists, the exact nature of the Athenian plague may never be known. In addition, crowding caused by the influx of refugees into the city led to inadequate food and water supplies and a probable proportionate increase in insects, lice, rats, and waste. These conditions would have encouraged more than one epidemic disease during the outbreak.

The Athenian plague being caused by a combination of multiple diseases has been proposed. However, Thucydides suggested that survivors gained clear immunity from it, which could not occur in a combination disease scenario as immunity to one disease would not necessarily confer immunity to another.

=== Typhus ===
In January 1999, the University of Maryland devoted their fifth annual medical conference, dedicated to notorious case histories, to the Plague of Athens. They concluded that the disease that killed the Greeks was typhus. "Epidemic typhus fever is the best explanation," said Dr. David Durack, consulting professor of medicine at Duke University. "It hits hardest in times of war and privation, it has about 20 percent mortality, it kills the victim after about seven days, and it sometimes causes a striking complication: gangrene of the tips of the fingers and toes. The Plague of Athens had all these features." In typhus cases, progressive dehydration, debilitation, and cardiovascular collapse ultimately cause the patient's death.

This medical opinion is supported by the opinion of A. W. Gomme, who wrote a comprehensive annotated edition of Thucydides and who also believed typhus was the cause of the epidemic. This opinion is expressed in his monumental work An Historical Commentary on Thucydides, completed after Gomme's death by A. Andrewes and K. J. Dover. Angelos Vlachos (Άγγελος Βλάχος), a member of the Academy of Athens and a diplomat, in his Remarks on Thucydides (Παρατηρήσεις στο Θουκυδίδη, [1992] I: 177–178) acknowledges and supports Gomme's opinion: "Today, according to Gomme, it is generally acceptable that it was typhus" ("Σήμερα, όπως γράφει ο Gomme, έχει γίνει από όλους παραδεκτό ότι ήταν τύφος").

=== Typhoid ===
==== Symptoms ====
Symptoms generally associated with typhoid resemble Thucydides' description. They include:

- a high fever of 39–40 °C (102–104 °F) that rises slowly
- chills
- bradycardia (slow heart rate)
- weakness
- diarrhea
- headaches
- myalgia (muscle pain)
- lack of appetite
- constipation
- stomach pains
- in some cases, a rash of flat, rose-colored spots called "rose spots"
- extreme symptoms such as intestinal perforation or hemorrhage, delusions and confusion are also possible.

Some characteristics of typhoid are at clear variance from Thucydides' description. Scavenger animals do not die from infection with typhoid, the onset of fever in typhoid is typically slow and subtle, and typhoid generally kills later in the disease course. As typhoid is most commonly transmitted through poor hygiene habits and public sanitation conditions in crowded urban areas, it is an unlikely cause of a plague emerging in the less urbanized Africa, as reported by Thucydides.

==== DNA analysis ====
A 2005 DNA study of dental pulp from teeth recovered from an ancient Greek burial pit, led by orthodontist Dr. Manolis Papagrigorakis of the University of Athens, found DNA sequences similar to those of Salmonella enterica (S. enterica), the organism that causes typhoid fever.

A second group of researchers, including American evolutionary molecular biologist Dr. Beth Shapiro of the University of California, Santa Cruz, disputed the Papagrigorakis team's findings, citing what they claim are serious methodological flaws. In a letter to the International Journal of Infectious Diseases, Shapiro et al. stated that "while this DNA analysis confirms that the Athens sequence is possibly Salmonella, it demonstrates clearly that it is not typhoid."

The technique used by the Papagrigorakis team (PCR) has shown itself to be prone to contamination-induced false-positive results, and the source burial site is known to have been heavily trafficked in antiquity by hogs, carriers of another Salmonella serovar that may have been confused with the one that causes typhoid fever. Nonetheless, the Papagrigorakis team asserts that the basis of this refutation is flimsy, and that the methodology used by the Shapiro team has historically produced conflicting results.

=== Viral hemorrhagic fever ===
Thucydides' narrative pointedly refers to increased risk among caregivers, more typical of the person-to-person contact spread of viral hemorrhagic fever (e.g., Ebola virus disease or Marburg virus) than typhus or typhoid. Unusual in the history of plagues during military operations, besieging Spartan troops are described as not having been afflicted by the illness raging near them within the city. Thucydides' description further invites comparison with VHF in the character and sequence of symptoms developed and of the usual fatal outcome on about the eighth day. Some scientists have interpreted Thucydides' expression "lygx kenē" (λύγξ κενή) as the unusual symptom of hiccups, which is now recognized as a common finding in Ebola virus disease. Outbreaks of VHF in Africa in 2012 and 2014 reinforced observations of the increased hazard to caregivers and the necessity of barrier precautions for preventing disease spread related to grief rituals and funerary rites. The 2015 West African Ebola outbreak noted the persistence of effects on genitalia and eyes in some survivors, both described by Thucydides. With an up to 21-day clinical incubation period, and up to 565-day infectious potential recently demonstrated in a semen-transmitted infection, movement of Ebola via Nile commerce into the busy port of Piraeus is plausible. Ancient Greek intimacy with African sources is reflected in accurate renditions of monkeys in the art of frescoes and pottery, most notably guenons (Cercopithecus), the type of primates responsible for transmitting Marburg virus into Germany and Yugoslavia when that disease was first characterized in 1967. Circumstantially tantalizing is the requirement for the large quantity of ivory used by the Athenian sculptor Phidias in the construction of two monumental ivory and gold statues of Athena and of Zeus (one of the Seven Wonders), which were fabricated in the same decade. Never again in antiquity was ivory used on such a large scale.

A second ancient narrative suggestive of hemorrhagic fever etiology is that of Titus Lucretius Carus. Writing in the 1st century BC, Lucretius characterized the Athenian plague as having bloody discharges from bodily orifices (Book 6.1146–47: "sudabant etiam fauces intrinsecus atrae / sanguine" – the throat sweated within, black with blood). That descriptor may have been derived from direct observation because Lucretius cited scientific predecessors in Greek Sicily: Empedocles and Acron. While none of the original works of Acron, a physician, are extant, it is reported that he died c. 430 BC after traveling from Sicily to Athens to assist against the plague.

Unfortunately, DNA sequence-based identification is limited by the inability of some important pathogens to leave a "footprint" retrievable from archaeological remains after several millennia. The lack of a durable signature by RNA viruses means some etiologies, notably the hemorrhagic fever viruses, are not testable hypotheses using currently available scientific techniques.
