= Growing teeth =

Bioengineering technology to create teeth

Growing teeth is a bioengineering technology with the ultimate goal to create new full molars in a person or an animal.

== Chronology ==
- 2002 – British scientists have learned how to grow almost whole, but feeble teeth from single cells.
- 2007 – Japanese scientists have bred mice almost full new teeth, but without a root.
- 2009 – from the stem cells were grown full teeth in mice, and even managed to grow a tooth root, previously it was not possible, but there is a problem, it is that grown teeth were slightly less "native" teeth.
- 2013 - Chinese scientists grow human teeth in mice using stem cells taken from human urine.
- 2015 - Growing New Teeth in the Mouth Using Stem-Cell Dental Implants
- 2018 - Protein disorder–order interplay to guide the growth of hierarchical mineralized structures.

== Methods ==
- Outer – the tooth is grown separately and implanted in the patient.
- Inner – the tooth is grown directly into the patient's mouth.

== Regenerative Research ==
- 2012 – Indian researchers found a way to cure and regenerate an infected root canal through stem cell activation. This replaces the old method of removing the tooth nerve.
- 2013 - Swiss researchers regenerate tooth enamel of early cavities using a peptide-based biomaterial.

== Links ==
- Alligators Inspire New Way for Growing Teeth
