= Aux =

Aux or AUX may refer to:

== Science and technology ==
- AUX (company), a Chinese electronics manufacturer
- Auxiliary connector or AUX jack, typically used for analog audio signals
- Aux/IAA repressors, related to auxin plant hormones

=== Computing ===
- AUX: (for auxiliary), a DOS text device
- AUX (CONFIG.SYS directive), changes assignment for AUX: device in DR-DOS
- A/UX, a Unix operating system by Apple

== Other uses ==
- Auxiliary (disambiguation) (abbreviation)
- Aux (TV channel), a Canadian music TV channel
- Araguaína Airport (IATA airport code), Tocantins, Brazil
