= Myrtis =

Archaeological remains of a Greek girl

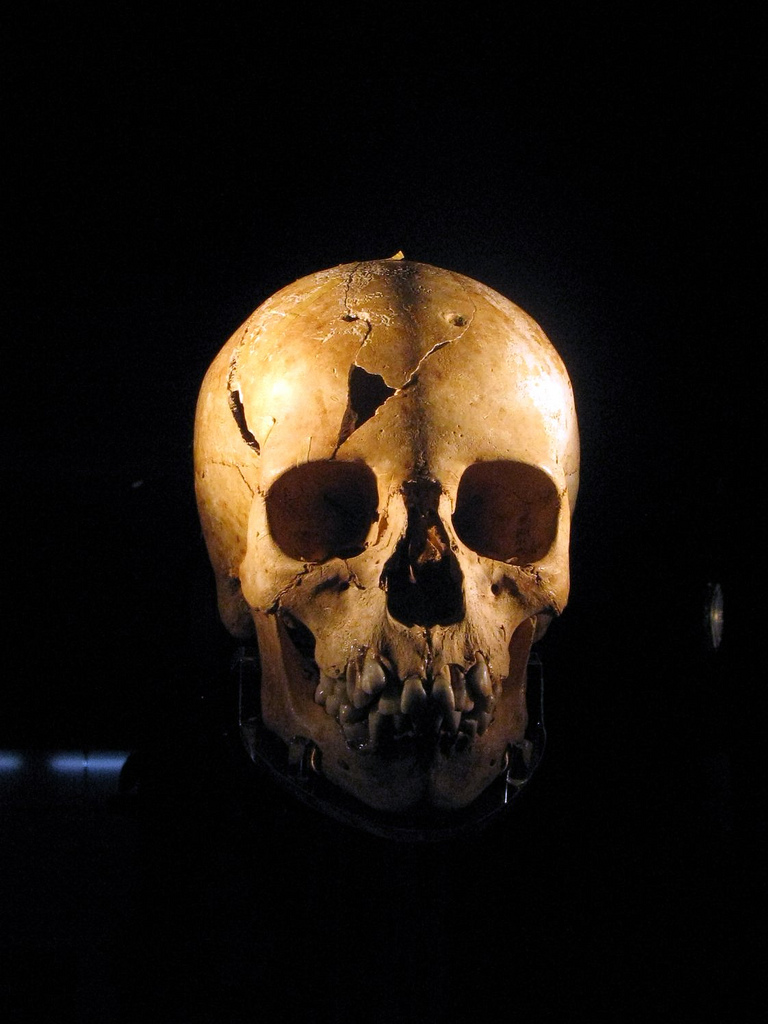
- Myrtis' skull
- Born: 441 BC
- Died: 430 BC (aged c. 11); Athens
- Body discovered: 1994–95

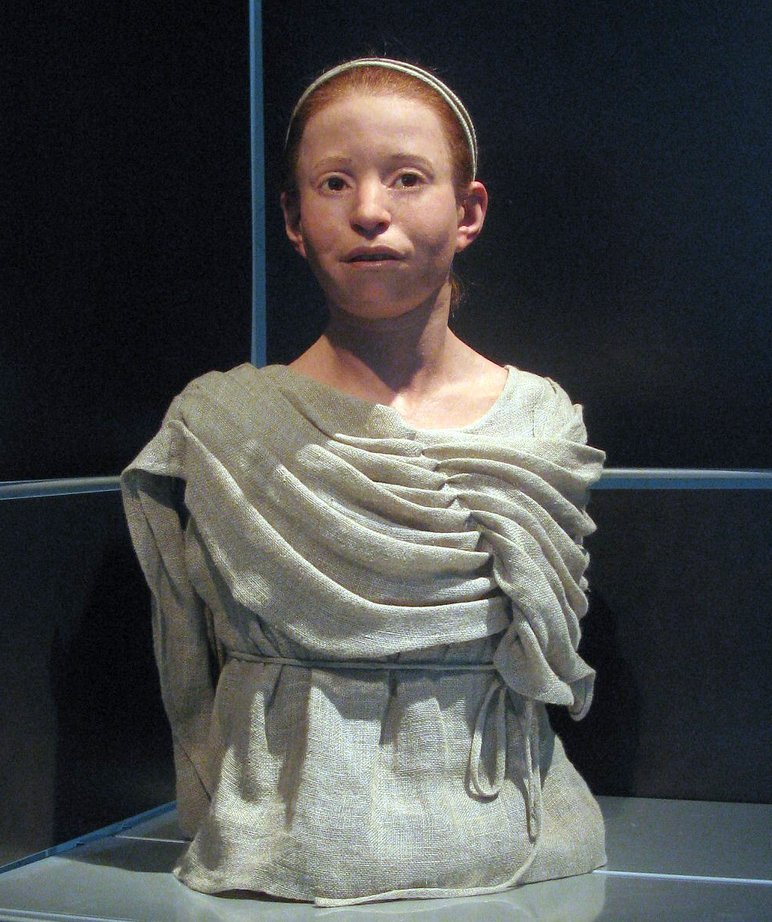
Myrtis' reconstructed appearance, National Archaeological Museum of Athens

Myrtis (Greek: Μύρτις) is the name given by archaeologists to an 11-year-old girl from ancient Athens, whose remains were discovered in 1994–95 in a mass grave during work to build the metro station at Kerameikos, Greece. The name was chosen from common ancient Greek names. The analysis showed that Myrtis and two other bodies in the mass grave had died of typhoid fever during the Plague of Athens in 430 BC.

The United Nations Regional Information Centre made Myrtis a friend of the Millennium Development Goals and used her in the UN campaign "We Can End Poverty".

== Reconstruction ==
Human skeletal evidence from Classical Greece is scarce, as most burials at that time were preceded by cremation. Before Myrtis, no attempt to reconstruct an Ancient Greek layperson's face has been recorded.

Myrtis' skull was in an unusually good condition and Greek orthodontics professor Manolis Papagrigorakis requested help from Swedish specialists to recreate her facial features. A special scanner was employed for the non-invasive acquisition of high-resolution anatomic data of Myrtis' skull. The volume of the skull was determined at 446 cm^{3}. Following scanning, an exact replica of her skull was created, which became the basis for subsequent forensic facial reconstruction. The reconstruction process followed the so-called "Manchester method": the facial tissues were laid from the skull surface outward by using depth marker pegs to determine thickness. The shape, size and position of the eyes, ears, nose and mouth were determined through the features of the underlying skeletal tissues. 20 different muscles were sculpted. The thickness of the facial tissues were evaluated according to average values taken from corresponding reference tables for age, gender and race. The mouth width and the lip thickness were estimated by the pattern and the skeletal craniofacial attributes of the associated area. Myrtis' reconstructed face was given brown eyes and red hair. The hairstyle she was given follows the fashion of the time.

== Dental condition ==
A class II skeletal and dental malocclusion was observed in Myrtis' remains. Other reported dental issues are the ectopic labial eruption of the maxillary canines mesially to their retained deciduous predecessors, the ectopic distally directed eruption of a lower first premolar and a unilaterally missing lower third molar.

== See also ==
- Women in Classical Athens
