= Enamel pearl =

Nodules of tooth enamel present elsewhere in the body

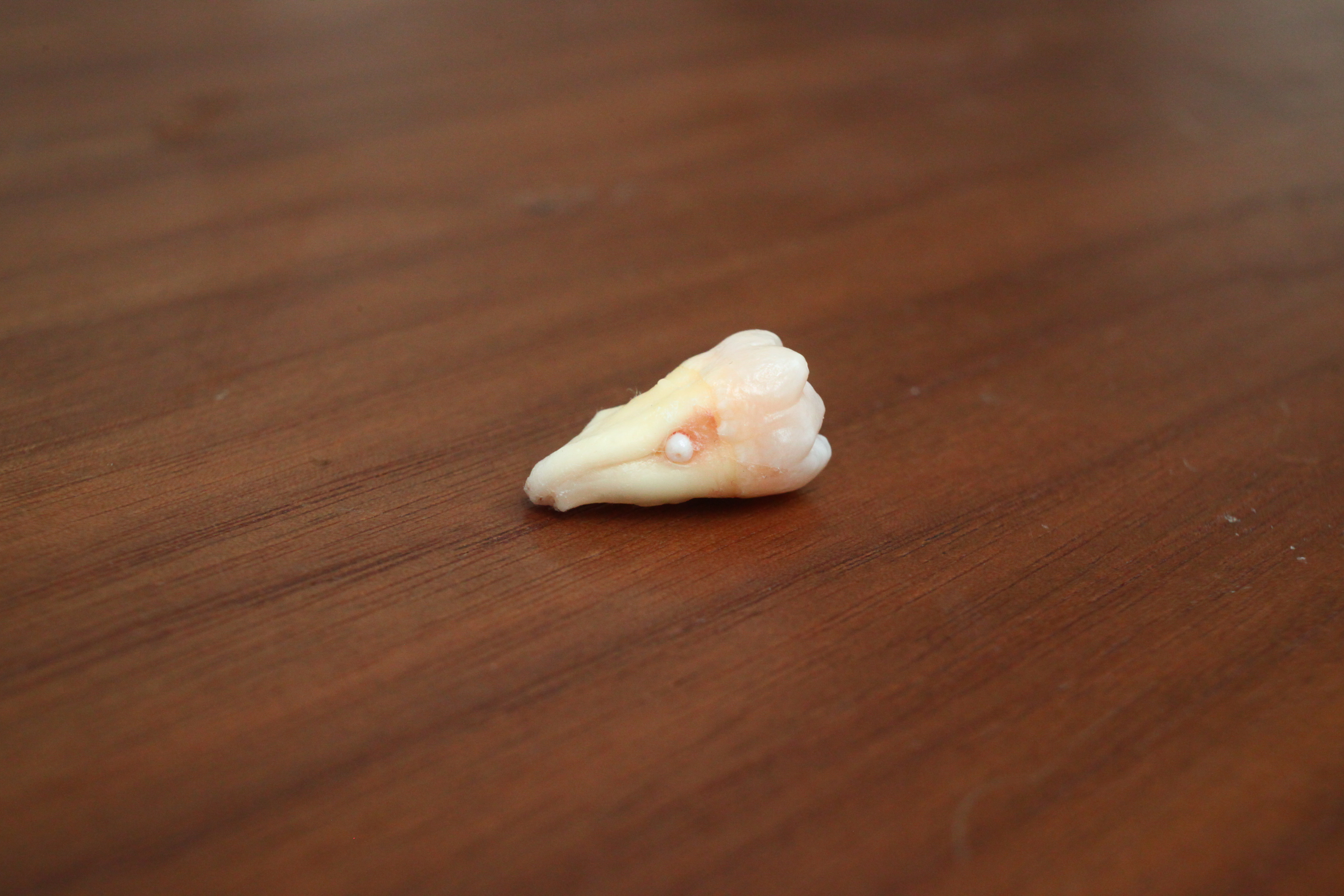
- Recently pulled wisdom tooth with enamel pearl
- Specialty: Dentistry

Enamel pearls are developmental variations of teeth that present as beads or nodules of enamel in places where they are not normally observed (ectopic enamel).

== Appearance and Location ==
Enamel pearls most commonly present as spheroid in shape, but can also be conical, cylindrical, oval, teardrop, and irregularly shaped. They vary in size with an average diameter of 1.7mm.

Enamel pearls are most frequently found in the root furcation of molars, and are not commonly seen in teeth with a single root, such as incisors and canines.

== Mechanisms of Formation ==
Several theories of enamel pearl development exist, although no definitive mechanism has been established. Enamel pearls are composed primarily of enamel, but most also have a core of dentin within them.

The most widely accepted theory suggests enamel pearls are formed from remnants of Hertwig’s epithelial root sheath (HERS), which adhere to the tooth surface after root development. During normal tooth development, after dentin formation is initiated on the root surface, the root sheath disintegrates and moves away from the root allowing the cells of the dental sac to contact predentin. This begins the differentiation of cementoblasts which in turn deposit cementum. However, when HERS remains adherent to the root surface, these fragments have the potential to develop into functional ameloblasts, which then deposit enamel onto the root surface, thereby forming enamel pearls. This theory is considered inconclusive as it does not account for the dentin component seen in some enamel pearls.

Alternative theories propose that enamel pearl formation is akin to the development of supernumerary tubercles or cusps, thus pearl formation must occur during initial dentin formation. Intradental enamel pearls may form during tooth formation, when ameloblasts are invaginated inside the developing dentin. Inner enamel epithelium cells may similarly invade connective tissue of the dental papilla, resulting in an internal enamel pearl.

=== Classification ===
Enamel pearls can be composed of different dental tissues (enamel, dentin, etc.) and can thus be classified based on this composition. Enamel-dentin pearls make up the largest proportion pearls and consist of a core of tubular dentin surrounded by enamel. Large enamel-dentin pearls may contain pulp within and are termed enamel-dentin-pulp pearls. Pearls that are composed exclusively of enamel are termed true enamel pearls or simple enamel pearls.

== Prevalence ==
Enamel pearls are estimated to occur in 1.1-9.7% of permanent molars, although higher rates are found when pearl detection is performed histologically instead of clinically. The highest prevalence of enamel pearls is found in the maxillary third molar, with an incidence of approximately 75%. Other common sites of occurrence include the mandibular third molar, and the maxillary second molar. The presence of two enamel pearls on the same tooth occurs in 8.7% of affected teeth, and up to four enamel pearls on the same tooth have been documented.
