= Tail of Spence =

Breast tissue extending into the axilla

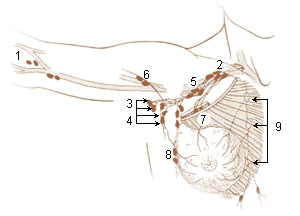
- Lymph nodes - #3 and #4 are in the region of the tail of Spence.

Details

Identifiers
- Latin: processus axillaris, processus lateralis mammae
- TA98: A16.0.02.007
- TA2: 7100
- FMA: 58072

The tail of Spence (Spence's tail, axillary process, axillary tail) has historically been described as an extension of the tissue of the upper outer quadrant of the breast traveling into the axilla. The "axillary tail" has been reported to pass into the axilla through an opening in the deep fascia called foramen of Langer. The "tail of Spence" was named after the Scottish surgeon James Spence, who served as a President of the Royal College of Surgeons in Edinburgh in the latter half of the 19th Century.

A recent publication has presented an updated description of the anatomy of the breast and upper outer chest, calling into question the concept of an axillary tail. The report does not challenge that lymphatic drainage consistently extends from the primary breast into the axilla through the foramen of Langer, but does demonstrate that a superolaterally oriented "tail" of breast fat (with or without ductal tissue) is rarely if ever present. Instead, upper lateral chest anatomy is consistently composed of the primary breast itself, a discrete axillary breast mound, and a lateral chest wall tail that never travels superiorly. A review of historical literature shows that Spence himself never wrote that adipose or breast-tissue extends into the axilla. He only published that surgeons should not operate on breast cancer if they found "an undefined tail-like projection creeping up from the breast towards the axilla", as though referring to the tumor tissue itself. Spence's peers interpreted his remarks and published with differing descriptions, blurring anatomic understanding. Since 1871, a notion evolved of a tail-like extension of fatty tissue originating from the upper outer portion of the breast and traveling into the axilla. Over the next 150 years, the concept became engrained in medical parlance and literature, even though there has never been a detailed anatomic description or published anatomic data to support the anecdotal mention made by Spence and described in various ways by other authors.

The breast is divided into quadrants for clinical reporting and oncological management purposes. It has been solidly established that tumor extension through lymphatics that travel in a contiguous chain from the primary breast into the axilla remains a poor oncologic prognosticator, especially when tumor originates in the upper outer quadrant of the breast. However, for anatomic clarity, oncologists and surgeons may want to consider that the adjacent but separate axillary mound is not a tissue extension of the primary breast. Instead, there is a growing awareness that separate focal vestigial breast mounds are consistently present in adults, located in pairs running down the curved lines of the embryological mammary ridges. It may be of great oncologic and surgical benefit if breast cancer formation and metastasis were reinterpreted in light of this new anatomic understanding. For example, it appears that the axillary mound is more likely to contain accessory ductal tissue than any of the other accessory fatty mounds along each mammary chain, perhaps more commonly serving as a nidus for breast cancer formation, though incidence of tumor formation in the other vestigial breast mounds has not been established.

== Breast cancer ==
Breast cancer can develop in the tail of Spence. One form is referred to as carcinoma of the axillary tail of Spence (CATS). Various studies have calculated CATS as representing 0.1-1% of breast cancers. These cancers may actually represent de novo tumors forming in the anatomically separate axillary breast mounds that were previously thought to be tail-like extensions of the primary breast.

== See also ==
- Anatomical terms of location
- Breast cancer
- Human anatomy
- Mammary ridge
