= Ectopic enamel =

Presence of tooth enamel elsewhere in the body

Ectopic enamel is an abnormality in the formation of enamel. It is tooth enamel that is found in an unusual location (ectopia), such as at the root of a tooth. Enamel pearls are a type of ectopic enamel.
