= Rose spots =

Medical sign

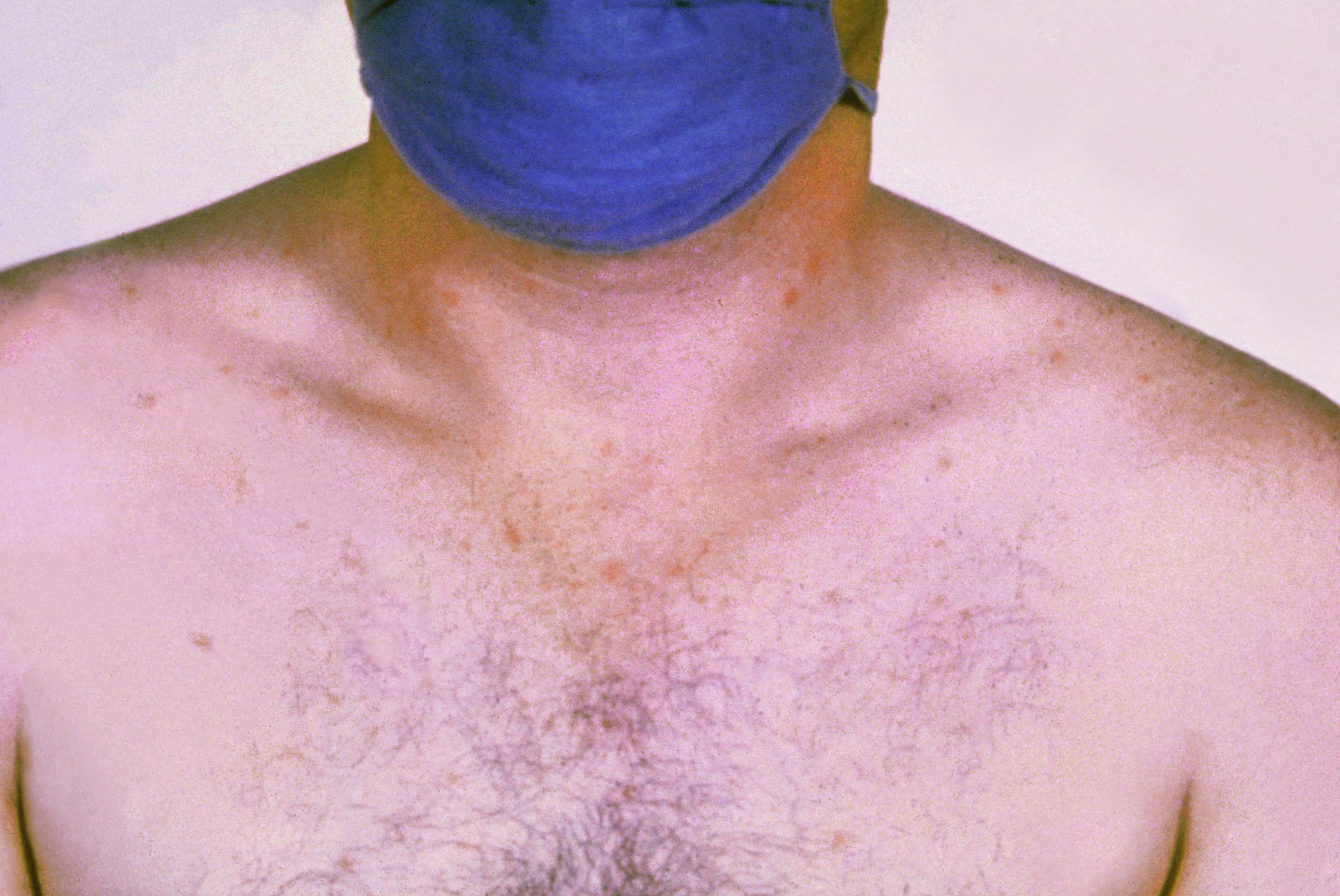
Rose spots on the chest of a patient with typhoid fever

Rose spots are blanching red macules 2-4 millimeters in diameter occurring in patients with enteric fever (which includes typhoid and paratyphoid). These fevers occur following infection by Salmonella typhi and Salmonella paratyphi respectively. Rose spots may also occur following invasive non-typhoid salmonellosis.

Rose spots are bacterial emboli to the skin and occur in approximately 1/3 of cases of typhoid fever. They are one of the classic signs of untreated disease, but can also be seen in other illnesses as well including shigellosis and nontyphoidal salmonellosis. They appear as a rash between the seventh and twelfth day from the onset of symptoms. They occur in groups of five to ten lesions on the lower chest and upper abdomen, and they are more numerous following paratyphoid infection. Rose spots typically last three to four days.
