= Supernumerary root =

- Specialty: Dentistry

Supernumerary roots is a condition found in teeth when there may be a larger number of roots than expected. The most common teeth affected are mandibular (lower) canines, premolars, and molars, especially third molars. Canines and most premolars, except for maxillary (upper) first premolars, usually have one root. Maxillary first premolars and mandibular molars usually have two roots. Maxillary molars usually have three roots. When an extra root is found on any of these teeth, the root is described as a supernumerary root. The clinical significance of this condition is associated with dentistry when accurate information regarding root canal anatomy is required when root canal treatment is required.
