= Maxillary =

Maxillary means "related to the maxilla (upper jaw bone)". Terms containing "maxillary" include:

- Maxillary artery
- Maxillary nerve
- Maxillary prominence
- Maxillary sinus
