= Auxiliary language =

An auxiliary language is a language that is not the primary or native language of a community. It may refer to:

- Interlanguage, an idiolect that has been developed by a learner of a second language
- International auxiliary language, a planned language constructed for international communication, such as Esperanto or International Sign
- Zonal auxiliary language, a planned language focused on one particular region, often blending elements of somewhat related languages in that region
- Minority language, a secondary language that has official recognition
- Sacred language, also called liturgical language or initiation language, used in religious services
- Lingua franca, a language used to facilitate communication between groups without a common native language

== See also ==
- International Auxiliary Language Association
- Secret language (disambiguation)
