= Dentin sialoprotein =

Protein found in teeth

Dentin sialoprotein is a protein found in teeth. It is one of the two proteins produced by the segmentation of dentin sialophosphoprotein. Dentin sialoprotein can be found in the dentin immediately subjacent to cellular cementum, but not subjacent to acellular fibrous cementum.

== Overview ==
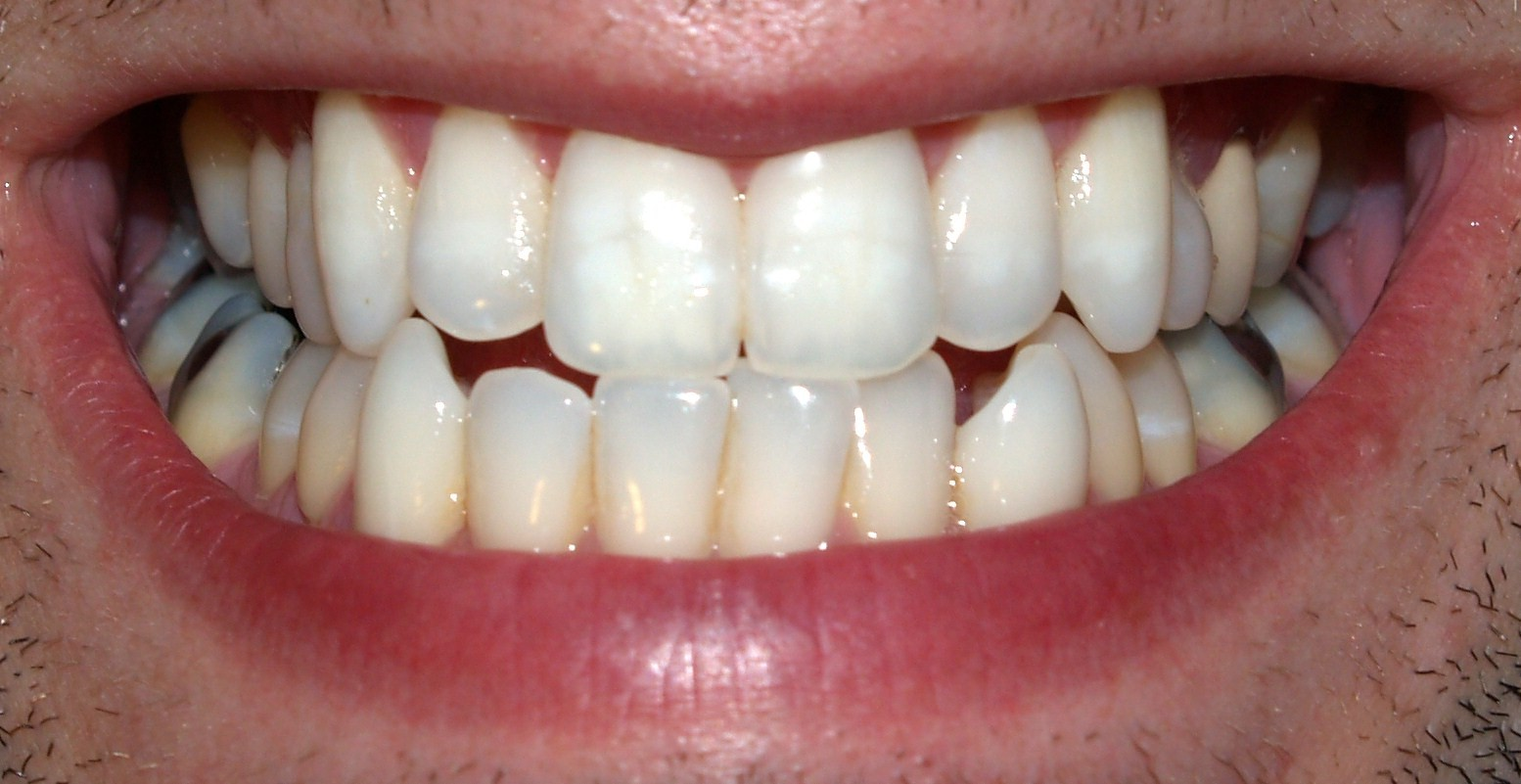
DSP is found in the teeth

DSP is one of the dominant proteins found in dentin. It is dominantly expressed in odontoblasts and the peptides derived from DSP regulate gene expression and phosphorylation, causing dental primary and stem cell differentiation. It was first discovered in 1981 but even now there is controversy about its functional significance. Since dentin sialoprotein (DSP) shares a similar makeup to bone sialoprotein (BSP) that is how it received its name. It is reported as a weak inhibitor of mineralization in dentin but its role is still unclear. DSP is a glycoprotein that accounts for part of the non-collageneous proteins in dentin. It is one of the acidic NCP's that is identified in the extracellular matrix and is most abundant alongside DPP. DSP is a proteolytically processed product of DSPP and contains 6.2 phosphates per molecule. The phosphate per molecule value is relatively lower than expected in the presence of DPP since there are a large amount of potential phosphorylation sites available. Since multiple experiments have been conducted, it has been found that in the vitro formation of hydroxyapatite and the growth of mineral crystals, DSP has little to no effect on mineralization.

== Function ==
Dentin sialoprotein (DSP) is an extracellular matrix protein found in dentin. It is an uncommon marker of dentinogenesis that is involved in the differentiation of odontoblast and dentin mineralization. Lately, it has been shown that DSP can lead to the start of the differentiation and mineralization of periodontal ligament stem cells as well as in dental papilla mesenchymal cells while in vitro. It is also involved in rescuing dentin deficiency and increasing enamel mineralization in animals. DSP appears at the mineralization front along with Phosphophoryn but only accounts for 5-8% of the dentin NCPs weight. The precise role is currently unknown but in situ studies, it is demonstrated that DSP is expressed in odontoblasts and preameloblasts but there is no information to directly explain the role in mineralization. DSP's are small fragments that are distributed into different compartments of the teeth and tend to increase the rate of enamel mineralization and lead to the differentiation of dental pulp cells. DSP is also responsible for pulp cell migration and differentiation. It can act as a structural protein or can take a part in modulating the formation of hydroxyapatite. Experiments have shown that the DSP expressed in odontoblasts is involved in dentin mineralization. The expression of DSP in preameloblasts and odontoblasts indicate that it might be able to induce the migration of dental pulp cells, odontoblast differentiation, and possibly dentin formation.

== Structure ==
DSP is found to have Glu, Asp, Ser, and Gly. Through sedimentation equilibrium and amino acid analyses, it is estimated that DSP has a weight of 53 kDa and has approximately 350 amino acids. Through Edman Degradation, the NH_{2}-terminal sequence is found to be IPVPNLPL. DSP is the amino-terminal part of DSPP, which is cleaved into DSP. The full length and COOH-terminal of DSP regulate bone and tooth gene expression and causes kinase phosphorylation, dentin mesenchymal differentiation and DSPP gene expression. It is a sialic acid-rich glycosylated protein that is a member of the small integrin-binding ligand N-linked glycoproteins (SIBLING) family, which also includes bone sialoprotein (BSP), dentin matrix protein-1 (DMP-1), osteopontin (OPN), and matrix extracellular phosphoglycoprotein (MEPE). Members of the SIBLING family typically contain the tripeptide RGD within the genes that bind to integrins and activate signal transduction but DSP lacks any of the RGD domain. The amino acid residues are important in the binding to the integrin β6. This promotes the cell attachment, migration, differentiation, and mineralization of dental mesenchymal cells. The domain of DSP regulates DSPP expression and homeostasis of odontoblasts through a positive feedback loop. When mutations occur in the DSP domain, it can cause dentinogenesis imperfecta as well as dentin dysplasia which are the most common disorders in dentin. It is reported that Porcine and Bovine DSP are chondroitin sulfate-type proteoglycans. Furthermore, since DSP is produced by the cleavage of DSPP, the DSP homozygous negative phenotype doesn't provide much information on the roles of DSP or DPP in dentin mineralization. Mutations that are heterogenous in the coding domain of DSP can cause DGI-II as well as dentin dysplasia II which indicates that DSP, the NH2-terminus protein of DSPP is essential to dentinogenesis. The cleavage of DSPP into DSP and DPP is an activation step of the function of DSPP and without making the cleavage, it will result in dentin and periodontal development defects. DSP NH2-terminal fragments have been found to be weakly distributed into the mineralized dentin but the DSP COOH-terminal fragments are mainly restricted to the mineralized dentin.

== Analysis ==
DSP is expressed as a single mRNA transcript that codes for DSPP. DSP is a NCP which is found in bone and dentin and is very acidic. The NCPs are secreted into the ECM during formation and mineralization of the tissues and are thought to play key roles in osteogenesis and dentinogenesis. DSP contains roughly 30% of carbohydrates and 9% sialic acid. In an experiment that was conducted, it was found that DSP was also found in the long bones of rats in small quantities. It is estimated that the amount of DSP in the bone was 1/400 of the amount found in dentin and that larger quantities of DSP are found in dentin. Through DEAE-Sephacel chromatography analysis, the peak of DSP in dentin appears before the peak of DSP in bone does, which is likely from post-translational modifications. DSP is only synthesized by odontoblasts and pulp cells and seems to be transported through odontoblastic cell processes into the predentin-dentin junction. Since DSP is only synthesized by odontoblasts, it confirms that DSP represents a cell specific marker. Although DSP is found in bone as well as dentin, it is not found in the brain, salivary glands, lungs, intestines, muscles, or any other organs.
