= Pulp stone =

Type of dental mass

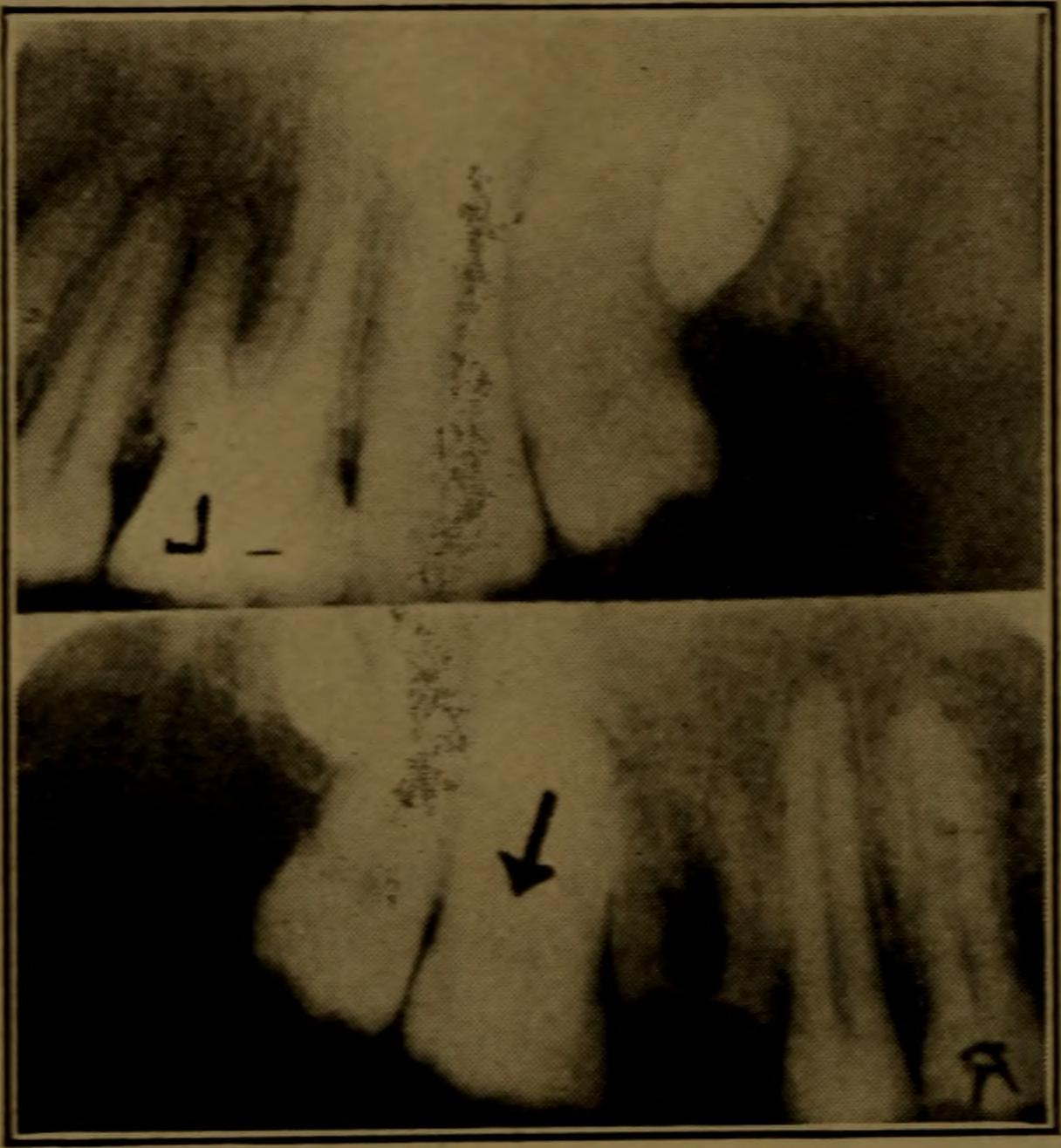

Pulp stones (also denticles or endoliths) are nodular, calcified masses appearing in either or both the coronal and root portions of the pulp organ in teeth. Pulp stones are not painful unless they impinge on nerves.

They are classified:

A) On the basis of structure

1) True pulp stones: formed of dentin by odontoblasts
2) False pulp stones: formed by mineralization of degenerating pulp cells, often in a concentric pattern

B) On the basis of location

1) Free: entirely surrounded by pulp tissue
2) Adherent: partly fused with dentin
3) Embedded: entirely surrounded by dentin

== Introduction ==
Pulp stones are discrete calcifications found in the pulp chamber of the tooth which may undergo changes to become diffuse pulp calcifications such as dystrophic calcification. They are usually noticed by radiographic examination and appeared as round or ovoid radiopaque lesions. Clinically, a tooth with a pulp stone has normal appearance like any other tooth. The number of pulp stones in a single tooth may vary from 1 to 12 or more, with varying sizes from minute particles to large masses which tend to occlude the pulpal space. It is reported that pulp stones are more commonly found in the coronal region of pulp, albeit also found in the radicular pulp.

It is believed that pulp stones develop around a central nidus of pulp tissue, for instance collagen fibril, ground substance and necrotic cell remnants. Initial calcification occurs around the central nidus and extends outward with regular calcified material in a concentric or radial manner.

== Etiology ==
The pulp calcifications can arise due to:

- pulp degeneration
- increasing age
- circulatory disturbances within the pulp
- long standing local irritants such as dental caries, pulp-capping procedures, healed tooth fractures, tooth injury restorations and periodontal diseases
- orthodontic tooth movements
- transplantation of teeth
- trauma

It is shown that pulp stone occurring in adolescents is significantly associated with carious and/or restored teeth, which suggests a causative relationship of chronic pulp irritation to pulp stone formation. A defence reaction in the pulpodentinal complex may be triggered by caries and microleakage around restorations which lead to pulp calcifications. The formation of pulp stone may have a similar mechanism as the tertiary dentine formation near the irritated odontoblasts. Apart from that, with aging, the pulp decreases in size due to the deposition of secondary or tertiary dentine. This subsequently results in favourable conditions for the formation of pulpal calcifications.

The other reported etiologic factors also include:

- idiopathic factors
- consumption of fluoride supplements
- hypervitaminosis D
- a possible genetic predisposition such as dentinogenesis imperfecta and dentinal dysplasia

== Types/classification ==
Pulp stones can be classified based on different location and structure.

Based on location, they can classified into free, embedded and adherent pulp stones. Free pulp stones are found within the pulp tissue and is the most common encounter. The size vary from 50μm in diameter to several millimetres and may occlude the entire pulp chamber. Embedded pulp stone is fully embedded in dentine and most commonly found in the apical portion of the root. Adherent pulp stones are attached to the wall of pulp space but not fully enclosed by dentine.

Structurally, pulp stones can be classified as true and false pulp stones. True pulp stones are made up of dentine that is lined by odontoblast. True pulp stones are quite rare. On the other hand, false pulp stones are made up of concentric layers of mineralised tissue around blood thrombi, collagen fibres, or dying and dead cells.

== Histopathology ==
Histologically, there are two types of stones: (1) stones with regular calcifications (2) stones with irregular calcifications. For regular calcification, the pulp stones are smooth, round or ovoid with concentric laminations. It is commonly found in the coronal pulp. As for irregular calcifications without laminations, pulp stones may have the shape of rods or leaves and the surface is rough. It is more common in the radicular pulp. Pulp stones with regular calcification grow in size by addition of collagen fibrils to their surface, whereas the irregular type of pulp stones are formed by calcification of pre-existing collagen fibres.

Pulp stones may also form around epithelial cells such as remnants of Hertwig's epithelial root sheath. It is presumed that epithelial remnants are able to induce adjacent mesenchymal stem cells to differentiate into odontoblasts.

== Associations ==
A pilot study was done with patients with cardiovascular disease (CVD) and it shows increased incidence of pulp stones in teeth with patients with CVD compared to healthy patients without CVD. There are also researchers which suggest the link between pulpal calcification and carotid artery calcification, despite not having a strong proof on this correlation. Besides cardiovascular disease, other disease such as end stage renal disease, Marfan syndrome, Ehlers–Danlos syndrome, calcinosis universalis, tumoral calcinosis are also discovered to be in association with pulpal calcifications.

Several genetic diseases such as dentin dysplasia and dentinogenesis imperfecta are also accompanied by pulpal calcifications and hence, Marfan syndrome was suspected to be in association with pulp stones due to abnormal dentin formation, leading to the increased frequency of pulpal calcifications in these individuals. Another theory suggests that individuals with Marfan syndrome have connective tissue dysplasia or vascular defects which in the case of tooth pulp, endothelial rupture of the pulp arterioles will lead to hemorrhagic areas in the pulp. It was proposed that these hemorrhagic areas in the pulp will induce mineralization within the pulp.

== Prevalence ==
Pulpal calcifications can be developed throughout the life and prevalence rates from 8–9% in worldwide population had been reported in studies. It was also found that pulpal stones occurred most frequently over the fourth decade, in advancing age.

Generally, pulp stones are more frequent to be found in maxillary teeth compared to mandibular teeth. A study in Australia resulted higher occurrences of pulp stones in molars as opposed to premolars, and first molars as opposed to second molars. First molars which were restored and/or with caries showed a higher incidence of pulp stones as compared to intact, unrestored first molars.

== Clinical implications ==
Pulp stones generally do not have significant clinical implications as they are usually not a source of pain, discomfort or any form of pulpitis. However, when the tooth concerned will undergo endodontic treatment such as root canal treatment, presence of large pulp stones will be clinically significant.

Large pulp stones in the pulp chamber might block the access to canal orifices and prevent the exploring dental instruments from passaging down the canal. In these cases, burs or even ultrasonic instrumentation can be used to remove the blocking pulp stones. During the removal process, sodium hypochlorite which has dissolving action can also be used as a synergistic effect.
