= Karl von Korff =

German anatomist and histologist

Karl von Korff (born 6 October 1867, in Hajen near Gröhnde) was a German anatomist and histologist.

From 1890 to 1895 he studied medicine at the universities of Freiburg, Berlin and Kiel, receiving his doctorate at Kiel in 1895 with the dissertation Beitrag zur Lehre vom Ulcus corneae serpens. In 1896/97 he served as a ship's physician for a Hamburg shipping company traveling to China and Japan, and afterwards worked as an assistant to Walther Flemming at the anatomical institute in Kiel. In 1902 he obtained his habilitation for anatomy, and in 1913 was named an associate professor at the University of Tübingen.

In 1905 he described what would later become known as "Korff fibers", defined as fibers that pass between odontoblasts at the periphery of the dental pulp and fan out into the dentin.

== Selected writings ==
- Zur Histogenese der Spermien von Helix pomatia, 1899 – Histogenesis on the sperm of Helix pomatia.
- Über die Genese der Zahnbein- und Knochengrundsubstanz der Säugetiere, 1905 – On the origin of dentin and bone matrix in mammals.
- Die Entwicklung der Zahnbein- und Knochengrundsubstanz der Säugetiere, 1906 – Development of dentin and bone matrix in mammals.
- Zur Histologie und Histogenese des Bindegewebes, besonders der Knochen- und Dentingrundsubstanz, 1907 – On the histology and histogenesis of connective tissue, especially involving bone and dentin matrix.
- Zur Lösung der Dentinfrage: Bemerkungen zu den Arbeiten (with Victor von Ebner, 1909) – Answers to dentin questions.
