= Korff fibers =

Dental fibers

Korff fibers, also von Korff fibers are thick collageneous fibers in the developing tooth that begin in the dental papilla, spiral between the cells of the odontoblast layer, and form the matrix of the dentin. They are often the first sign of dentin formation. They are 0.1 to 0.2 μm in diameter and take a corkscrew path through the odontoblast layer and become incorporated into the layer of predentin. These fibers are named after German anatomist Karl von Korff. It consist of type 3 collagen, associated, at least initially, with fibronectin.
