= Dentin dysplasia =

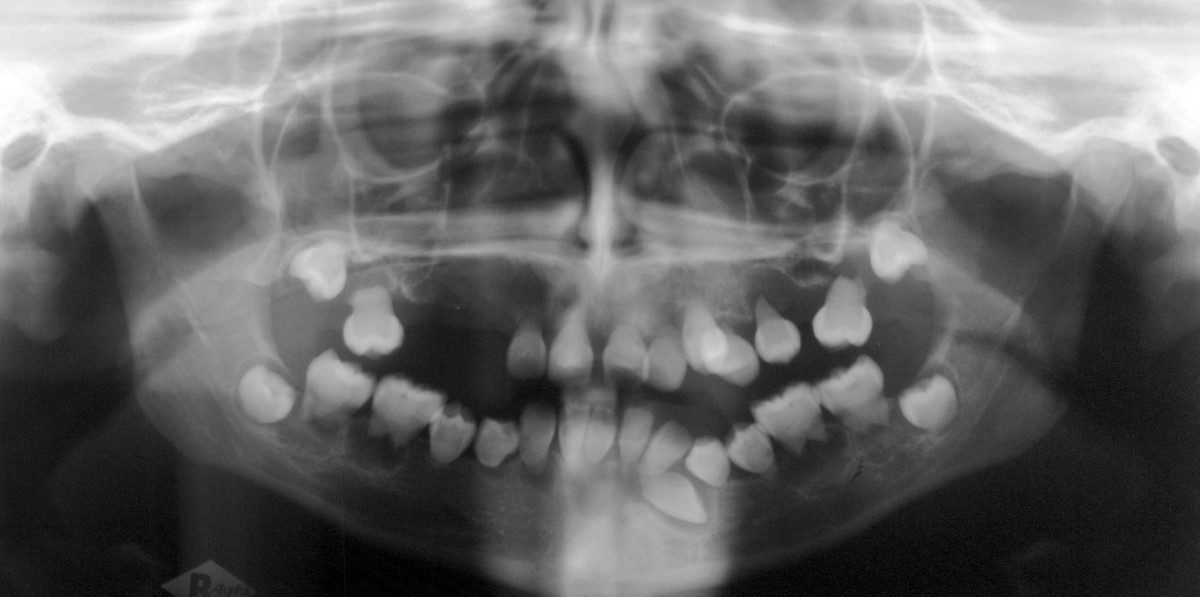
- Preoperative panoramic radiographs showing features of dentin dysplasia type I
- Specialty: Dentistry

Dentin dysplasia (DD) is a rare genetic developmental disorder affecting dentine production of the teeth, commonly exhibiting an autosomal dominant inheritance that causes malformation of the root. It affects both primary and permanent dentitions in approximately 1 in every 100,000 patients. It is characterized by the presence of normal enamel but atypical dentin with abnormal pulpal morphology. Witkop in 1972 classified DD into two types which are Type I (DD-1) is the radicular type, and type II (DD-2) is the coronal type. DD-1 has been further divided into 4 different subtypes (DD-1a,1b,1c,1d) based on the radiographic features.

== Signs and symptoms ==
Clinically the teeth look normal in colour and morphologic appearance; however, they are commonly very mobile and exfoliated prematurely.

Both primary and permanent dentitions can be affected by either type I or type II dentin dysplasia. However, deciduous teeth affected by type II dentin dysplasia have a characteristic blue-amber discolouration, whilst the other dentition appears normal.

== Causes ==
The mutation in collagen type 1 (COL1 A1, COL1 A2) causes DI-1. It is similar to the systemic condition dental features known as osteogenesis imperfect. DI-2, DI-3 and DD-2 share the same genetic mutation of dentin sialophosphoprotein, that is located on chromosome 4. They are autosomal-dominant diseases with complete penetrance and variable expressivity. Due to the same genetic mutation, these diseases would often result in overlapping clinical and radiographic features. Therefore, prevailing theories suggest that DI-2, DI-3 and DD-2 are categorized as a single disease entity with variable severity of expression. However, the causes of DD-1 have yet to be theorized.

== Diagnosis ==
Diagnosis is mostly based on general examination and radiographs, and it should be taken when abnormality of the teeth is suspected as most of the affected teeth have a normal clinical appearance.

Differential diagnosis is very important to have a definitive diagnosis as some radiographic or histologic features of dentine dysplasia may bear a resemblance to different disorders:

- Dentinogenesis imperfecta
- Odontodysplasia
- Calcinosis
- Osteogenesis imperfecta
- Ehlers–Danlos syndromes
- Goldblatt syndrome
- Schimke immuno-osseous dysplasia
- Brachio-skeleto-genital syndrome.

=== Type I: Radicular type ===
Type I has been known as radicular dentine dysplasia because the teeth have undeveloped root(s) with abnormal pulp tissue. Morphology and colour of the crown mostly appear normal, but occasionally teeth appear slightly amber-coloured or bluish-brown shine in primary teeth with no or only immature root development. The teeth are mostly maligned and have a higher risk of fracture.

==== Radiographic feature ====
In other words, affected primary teeth usually have abnormal -shaped or shorter than normal roots. "Crescent/half-moon shaped" pulp chamber remnant in permanent teeth can be seen on x-rays. The roots may appear to be darker or radiolucent/pointy and short with apical constriction. Dentine is laid down abnormally and causes excessive growth within the pulp chamber. This will reduce the pulp space and eventually cause incomplete and total pulp chamber obliteration in permanent teeth. Sometimes periapical pathology or cysts can be seen around the root apex. Most cases of DD associated with peri-apical radiolucency/ pathology have been diagnosed as radicular cysts, but some of them have been as diagnosed peri-apical granuloma instead.

=== Type II: Coronal type ===
Type II would mostly cause discolouration to the primary teeth. Affected teeth usually appear as brownish-blue, brown or yellow. Translucent "opalescence" is often one of the characteristics to describe teeth with DD-2. In some cases, teeth might show slightly amber-coloured, but in most of the cases permanent teeth are unaffected and appear normal regardless of colour, shape and size. Dental X-rays are the key to diagnosing dentine dysplasia, especially on permanent teeth. Abnormalities of the pulp chamber is the main characteristic to make a definitive diagnosis.

In the primary teeth, coronal dentin dysplasia may appear similar to Dentinogenesis Imperfecta type II (DG-II) but if abnormalities features appear to be more pronounced in the permanent teeth, then consider changing the diagnosis to DGI-II instead of DD-2.

==== Radiographic features ====
In the coronal type, teeth show normal roots containing enlarged pulp with abnormal extensions towards the roots, which is often described as "thistle tube" shaped on dental radiographs. As well as this, numerous pulp stones can often be found in the pulp chambers due to abnormal calcifications. In primary teeth, the pulp chamber is usually completely obliterated but in permanent teeth, the pulp may become partially obliterated after the eruption.

=== Histological features ===
There are a few studies and proposals that were designed to explain the pathogenesis of DD but the main reason of the cause still remains unclear in the dental literature. Logan et al., suggested that dental papilla is the cause of abnormal root growth or development. They also proposed that the calcification of multiple degenerative foci within the papillae reduces the growth and eventually leads to pulpal obliteration. Wesley et al., suggested that odontoblasts with abnormal function and/ or differentiation are mainly due to atypical interaction between odontoblasts and ameloblasts. Histopathologically, the deeper layer of the teeth shows abnormal dentine tubular pattern with unstructured, unorganised, atubular areas with a normal enamel appearance. The Globular or small mass of rounded or irregular shape of atypical dentine is often seen in the pulp.

== Treatment ==
With various options available to dentists, the treatment of this condition can still be difficult. Endodontic treatment is not advised for teeth with complete obliteration of root canals and pulp chambers. An alternative treatment for teeth with periapical abscesses and pulpal necrosis is dental extraction. Retrograde fillings and periapical surgery is a treatment option for teeth with longer roots, as well as orthodontic treatment. However, orthodontic treatment can lead to even more resorption of the roots, which could lead to further tooth mobility and premature exfoliation. Another proposed treatment, for successful oral rehabilitation, is to extract all teeth, curette any cysts and provide the patient with a complete denture. A combination of bone grafting and a sinus lift technique can also be successful to accomplish implant placement.

== Management ==
The best method of maintaining the health of teeth is to practice exemplary oral hygiene. More tooth loss is likely to occur if intervention takes place. However, factors such as present complaint, patient age, severity of the problem, can affect the treatment plan or options.

=== Stainless steel crowns ===
Stainless steel crowns which also known as "hall crowns" can prevent tooth wear and maintain the occlusal dimension in affected primary teeth. However, if demanded, composite facings or composite strip crowns can be added for aesthetic reasons.

=== Endodontics Treatment ===
Endodontic intervention can help conserve the existing health of affected permanent teeth. It is difficult to perform endodontic therapy on teeth that develop abscesses as a result of obliteration of the pulp chambers and root canals. An alternative to conventional therapy would be retrograde filling and periapical curettage. However, these therapies are not recommended for teeth with roots that are too short.

=== Removable dentures ===
Teeth with short, thin roots and marked cervical constrictions are less favourable for indirect restorations such as crown placements. If endodontics treatment fails, and an abscess develops around the root apex, extraction of the affected teeth would be the best treatment option. Dentures or over-dentures can be considered as rehabilitation until growth is completed. Cast partial dentures could also be an alternative treatment option and it only works if there are a few teeth that have enough root length to serve a retentive purpose.

=== Dental implants ===
Dental implant is one of the treatment options that can be considered when growth is fully attained. For patients who experience maxillo-mandibular alveolar atrophy due to early loss of teeth, an alveolar ridge augmentation procedure is recommended prior to the implant placement. Both onlay bone grafting and sinus lift techniques can be carried out together to accomplish implant placement.
