= Dentinogenesis imperfecta =

Genetic disorder impairing tooth development

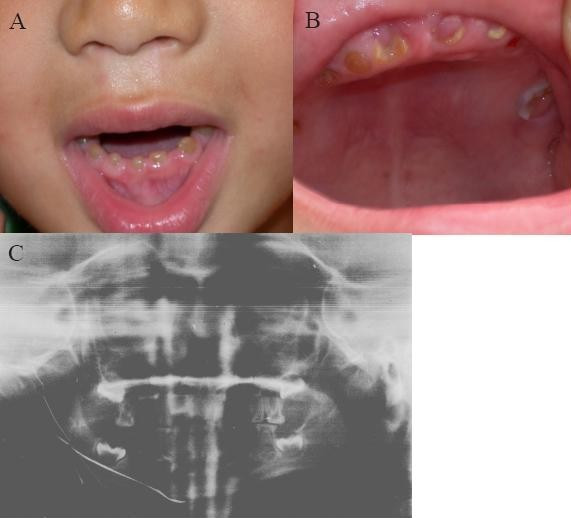
- Oral photographs from an individual with Dentinogenesis imperfecta
- Specialty: Dentistry

Dentinogenesis imperfecta (DI) is a genetic disorder of tooth development. It is inherited in an autosomal dominant pattern, as a result of mutations on chromosome 4q21, in the dentine sialophosphoprotein gene (DSPP). It is one of the most frequently occurring autosomal dominant features in humans. Dentinogenesis imperfecta affects an estimated 1 in 6,000-8,000 people.

People with this condition have abnormal enamel, short and narrow roots to their teeth, and can have very small dental pulps (nerve). This condition can cause teeth to be discolored (most often a blue-gray or yellow-brown color) and translucent, giving teeth an opalescent sheen. Teeth are also less mineralized than normal, making them prone to rapid wear, breakage, and loss. These problems can affect primary (baby) teeth alone, or both baby teeth and permanent (adult) teeth, with the primary teeth usually more severely affected.

Although genetic factors are the main contributor for the condition, any environmental or systemic changes that impede calcification or metabolization of calcium can also result in anomalous dentin.

== Classification ==
=== Shield classification (1973) ===
This is the most widely used classification for dentinogenesis imperfecta, and subdivides the condition into 3 types:

==== Type I ====
DI associated with Osteogenesis Imperfecta (OI). Type of DI with similar dental abnormalities usually an autosomal dominant trait with variable expressivity but can be recessive if the associated osteogenesis imperfecta is of recessive type.

Recent genetic studies have identified that mutations in the genes coding for the collagen type 1 proteins, COL1A1 and COL1A2, are associated with this type of DI.

Not all individuals with OI have dentinogenesis imperfecta, and the prevalence of DI varies depending on the subtype of OI:

- Higher prevalence of DI among individuals with OI type III and IV at 43-82% and 37-100%, respectively
- Lower prevalence of DI among individuals with OI type I at 8-40%
- No data available for other OI subtypes

==== Type II ====
DI not associated with OI. Occurs in people without other inherited disorders (i.e. Osteogenesis imperfecta). It is an autosomal dominant trait. A few families with type II have progressive hearing loss in addition to dental abnormalities. Also called hereditary opalescent dentin.

==== Type III ====
Brandywine isolate. This type is rare with occurrences only in the secluded populations in Maryland, USA. Similar to DI type II, this type is also not associated with OI. Its predominant characteristic is bell-shaped crowns, especially in the permanent dentition. Unlike Types I and II, it involves teeth with shell-like appearance and multiple pulp exposures.

Mutations in the gene coding for the dentine sialophosphoprotein (DSPP) are associated with DI type II and III. DSPP is a polypeptide which gives rise to 3 proteins; dentine sialoprotein (DSP), dentine glycoprotein (DGP), and dentine phosphoprotein (DPP). The DPP protein is thought to contribute to hydroxyapatite crystal formation and growth, a fundamental crystal which is widely distributed in mineralized dentin and enamel. The function of the DGP and DSP proteins is not well understood.

Genetic studies have shown that type II and III may be the same subtype of dentinogenesis imperfecta, differing only by the severity.

=== de La Dure-Molla, Foruner and Berdal (2015) ===
de La Dure-Molla, Foruner and Berdal (2015) have proposed a new classification to supersede the Shield Classification (1973). This new classification is designed to overcome the shortcomings of its predecessor, mainly the clinical difficulty in using the Shield classification due to the overlapping signs and symptoms between the subtypes.

In this classification, the authors propose that the DSPP (dentine sialophosphoprotein) diseases, that is dentinogenesis imperfecta and dentin dysplasia, are jointly named "Dentinogenesis imperfecta", and sub-types are determined according to the severity of the condition. There are a few exceptions:

- Shields' Dentine Dysplasia type I - this condition is unique in that it only affects root development, and is separately termed "radicular dentin dysplasia" in the new classification.
- Shields' Dentinogenesis Imperfecta type I - this subtype is not acknowledged in this new classification as the authors deem it a different condition since it is a syndrome of osteogenesis imperfecta

==== Mild type ====
Primary (baby) teeth are moderately affected.

Permanent (adult) teeth are not discolored, or the discoloration is mild (grey colour). Little or no attrition (tooth wear) is evident. The crown of the teeth may be bulbous and markedly constricted at the CEJ.

Radiographically, evidence of partial pulp obliteration with a "thistle-shaped appearance".

==== Moderate type ====
Teeth are moderately discolored (blue, grey or amber opalescent). More attrition is evident with shortening of crown height. Crowns may appear bulbous with prominent constriction at the CEJ.

Radiographically, the pulp is small or is totally obliterated. Roots appear thinner and shorter than average. There may be periapical pathology.

==== Severe type ====
Teeth are markedly discolored (brown opalescent). The crowns are very short due to severe attrition. Crowns may appear bulbous with prominent constriction at the CEJ.

Radiographically, pulp appears large and the dentin layer is thin ("shell teeth" as described in Presentation section). Roots are thin and short. There may be multiple periapical pathologies.

==== Radicular dentin dysplasia ====
This subtype is used in place of Shields' dentine dysplasia type I, in which only the roots of the teeth are affected.

Both primary and permanent teeth are affected.

The teeth appear normal clinically. Radiographically, the roots are shorter and fused together with a rounded apex.

== Presentation ==
=== Clinical presentation ===
Clinical features include:

- Discolored teeth - teeth may be amber, brown, blue or opalescent
- Bulbous shape to the tooth crown due to cervical constriction
- Tooth wear/Non-carious tooth surface loss (NCTSL) - due to the poorly mineralized dentin, the enamel of the tooth is unsupported and subsequently shears or chips off as it is subjected to occlusal (biting) forces. This exposes the underlying less mineralized dentin which is less resistant to wear. Therefore, features of abrasion and attrition may become apparent.
- Reduction in occlusal vertical dimension (OVD) - this is secondary to the tooth wear/NCTSL. A reduced OVD can lead to craniofacial dysgnathia, poor tooth aesthetics, and disorders during chewing, swallowing, speaking and eating.

The primary (baby) teeth are usually more severely affected than permanent (adult) teeth.

Enamel is usually lost early because it is further inclined to attrition due to loss of scalloping at the dentinoenamel junction (DEJ). It was suggested that the scalloping is beneficial for the mechanical properties of teeth as it reinforces the junction between enamel and dentin. However, the teeth are not more susceptible to dental caries than normal ones.

Periodontal disease, or gum disease, is a common finding amongst individuals with dentinogenesis imperfecta despite no clinical findings of tooth decay (dental caries). The reason for this is currently not well understood.

Certain patients with dentinogenesis imperfecta will have multiple periapical abscesses apparently resulting from pulpal strangulation secondary to pulpal obliteration or from pulp exposure due to extensive coronal wear. They may need apical endontics to save the involved teeth.

Note that, although dentin exposure is a common clinical finding, individuals with dentinogenesis imperfecta usually do not experience tooth sensitivity as the exposed dentin is typically sclerosed (hardened), thereby appearing glassy/shiny.

=== Radiographic presentation ===
Radiographic features include:

- Bulbous shape of tooth crown with pronounced cervical constriction
- Small pulp, or total pulp obliteration
- Small or obliterated root canal
- Presence of pulp stones
- Narrow and small roots
- Periapical radiolucency without any evidence of clinical pathology such as tooth decay (dental caries)

=== Presentation by subtype of Dentinogenesis Imperfecta ===
Clinical and radiographic features can be categorised by the subtype of dentinogenesis imperfecta (see Shield's Classification in the Classification section):

==== Type I ====
Clinically, both the primary (baby) and permanent (adult) teeth often appear amber colored and translucent, and show signs of severe attrition. Primary teeth have a more obvious appearance as they have a thinner layer of enamel overlying dentin, thus the abnormal color of dentin is more noticeable.

Radiographically, affected teeth have short and narrow roots, and obliterated pulps due to dentin hypertrophy before or shortly after tooth eruption.

The severity of these features is variable, with some teeth presenting with total obliteration of the pulp, while other teeth appear to have normal, healthy dentin

Some type I cases present with no clinical findings, with only radiographic abnormalities.

==== Type II ====
Type II has a similar clinical and radiographic appearance to type I with some distinguishing features:

- Bulbous crowns are common with pronounced cervical constriction
- All teeth in the mouth are affected, with severe abnormalities present in both the primary (baby) and permanent (adult) teeth. This is in contrast to type I where the presentation is more variable
- Rarely, individuals exhibit sensorineural hearing loss. It is proposed this hearing loss is a secondary feature to attrition; this type of tooth wear can cause jaw overclosure with subsequent changes to the shape of the inner ear, thus causing hearing loss. However, the true cause remains unknown.

==== Type III ====
Similar clinical and radiographic features to that of type I and II are apparent for the permanent (adult) teeth. The main distinguishing feature is "shell teeth", a term used to describe the unique appearance of the primary (baby) teeth; the primary teeth have multiple pulp exposures and radiographically appear hollow as the dentin layer is thin (dentin hypotrophy) and the pulp chamber is very large.

== Histology ==
The enamel has a regular structure, however, there are abnormalities in the structure of dentin and at the amelo-dentinal junction. These abnormalities include:

- Fewer dentinal tubules
- Dentinal tubules may be of smaller diameter, irregular in shape, and may also be obliterated
- Abnormal morphology of apatite crystals
- Higher water and collagen content in the organic component of dentin (see Structure section on dentin page to learn more)

== Diagnosis ==
To determine if the condition has been inherited, it is suggested to ask if any other family member has Dentinogenesis imperfecta. A lack of family history may indicate that the condition was acquired.

It is suggested that the dental/medical professional establish if the condition is a syndrome of another inherited condition such as:

- Osteogenesis imperfecta - indicates Type I Dentinogenesis Imperfecta (see Shield's Classification in Classification section)
- Ehlers Danlos syndrome
- Goldblatt syndrome
- Schimke immune-osseus dysplasia
- Brachio-skeleto-genital syndrome
- Osteodysplastic and primordial short stature with severe microdontia
- Opalescent teeth
- Rootless molars

[This is not a comprehensive list]

It can be useful to enquire about symptoms of osteogenesis imperfecta, as Type I Dentinogenesis Imperfecta (Shield's Classification) is associated with osteogenesis imperfecta. Notable information includes:

- History of bone fracture caused by minimal trauma
- Short stature
- Blue sclera
- Hearing loss

Common dental features of osteogenesis imperfecta include:

- Hypodontia
- Oligodontia
- Taurodontism
- Unerupted permanent second molars, with no obstruction in the path of eruption
- Retrognathic maxilla

=== Differential diagnosis ===
- Hypocalcified forms of amelogenesis imperfecta
- Congenital erythropoietic porphyria
- Conditions that can cause early loss of teeth e.g. Kostmann's disease, cyclic neutropenia, Chediak-Hegashi syndrome, histiocytosis X, Papillon-Lefevre syndrome
- Permanent tooth discolouration caused by medications such as tetracyclines, or medical conditions such as rickets

== Treatment ==
Preventive and restorative care are important as well as aesthetics as a consideration. This ensures preservation of the patient's vertical dimension between their maxillary (upper) and mandibular (lower) teeth when they occlude (bite together). The basis of treatment is standard throughout the different types of DI where prevention, preservation of vertical dimension, maintenance of function, and aesthetic needs are priority. Preventive efforts can limit pathology occurring within the pulp, which may render future endodontic procedures less challenging, with better outcomes.

- Challenges are associated with root canal treatment of teeth affected by DI due to pulp chamber and root canal obliteration, or narrowing of such spaces.
- If root canal treatment is indicated, it should be done in a similar way like with any other tooth. Further consideration is given for restoring the root-treated tooth as it has less mineralized dentin which may not withstand the restoration.

Preservation of vertical dimension may be by use of stainless steel crowns which are advocated for primary teeth where vertical dimension may be hugely compromised due to loss of tooth tissue as a result of attrition, erosion of enamel.

In most cases, full-coverage crowns or veneers (composite/porcelain) are needed for aesthetic appearance, as well as to prevent further attrition. Another treatment option is bonding, putting lighter and harder dental materials on the less mineralized enamel of the teeth and with many treatments of this bonding, the teeth appear whiter. Due to lower mineralization of the teeth, many common cosmetic procedures such as orthodontics (braces) and prosthodontics (such as bridges) are inappropriate for patients with Dentinogenesis imperfecta and are likely to cause even more damage than the situation they were intended to correct.

Dental whitening (bleaching) is contraindicated although it has been reported to lighten the somewhat color of DI teeth with some success; however, because the discoloration is caused primarily by the underlying yellow-brown dentin, this alone is unlikely to produce normal appearance in cases of significant discoloration.

If there is considerable attrition, overdentures may be prescribed to prevent further attrition of remaining teeth and for preserving the vertical dimension.

=== Management of DI associated with OI ===
Bisphosphonates have recently been introduced to treat several bone disorders, which include osteogenesis imperfecta.

A recognized risk of this drug relevant to dental treatments is bisphosphonate-associated osteonecrosis of the jaw (BRONJ). Occurrences of this risk is associated with dental surgical procedures such as extractions.

Dental professionals should therefore proceed with caution when carrying out any dental procedures in patients who have Type 1 DI who may be on bisphosphonate drug therapy.

== See also ==
- Dentin
- Dentinogenesis
- Tooth development
- Osteogenesis imperfecta
