= Mineralized tissues =

Biological tissues incorporating minerals

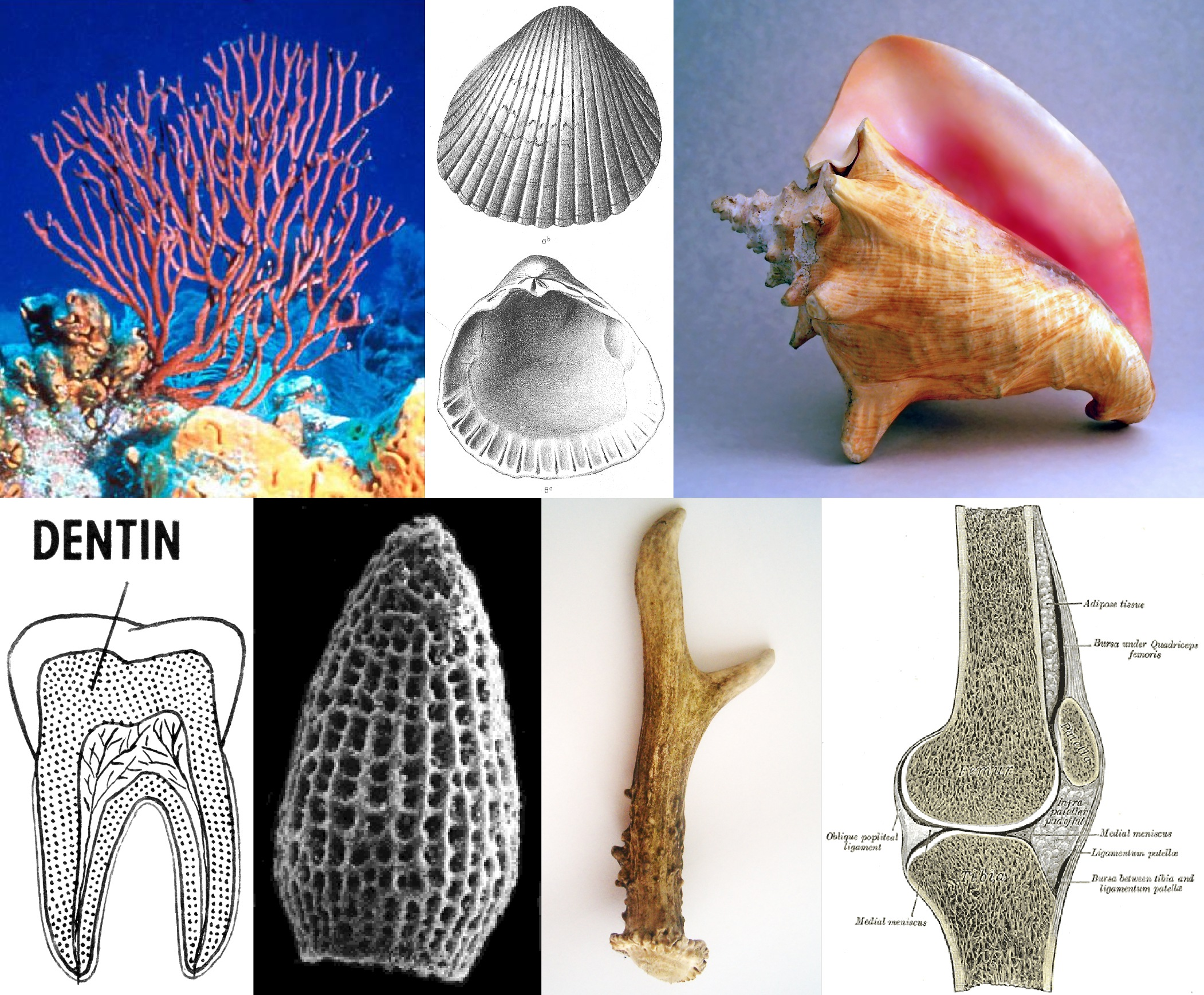
Mineralized tissues: sea sponge, sea shells, conch, dentin, radiolarian, antler, bone

Mineralized tissues are biological tissues that incorporate minerals into soft matrices. Typically these tissues form a protective shield or structural support. Bone, mollusc shells, deep sea sponge Euplectella species, radiolarians, diatoms, antler bone, tendon, cartilage, tooth enamel and dentin are some examples of mineralized tissues.

These tissues have been finely tuned to enhance their mechanical capabilities over millions of years of evolution. Thus, mineralized tissues have been the subject of many studies since there is a lot to learn from nature as seen from the growing field of biomimetics. The remarkable structural organization and engineering properties makes these tissues desirable candidates for duplication by artificial means. Mineralized tissues inspire miniaturization, adaptability and multifunctionality. While natural materials are made up of a limited number of components, a larger variety of material chemistries can be used to simulate the same properties in engineering applications. However, the success of biomimetics lies in fully grasping the performance and mechanics of these biological hard tissues before swapping the natural components with artificial materials for engineering design.

Mineralized tissues combine stiffness, low weight, strength and toughness due to the presence of minerals (the inorganic part) in soft protein networks and tissues (the organic part). There are approximately 60 different minerals generated through biological processes, but the most common ones are calcium carbonate found in mollusk shells and hydroxyapatite present in teeth and bones. Although one might think that the mineral content of these tissues can make them fragile, studies have shown that mineralized tissues are 1,000 to 10,000 times tougher than the minerals they contain. The secret to this underlying strength is in the organized layering of the tissue. Due to this layering, loads and stresses are transferred throughout several length-scales, from macro to micro to nano, which results in the dissipation of energy within the arrangement. These scales or hierarchical structures are therefore able to distribute damage and resist cracking. Two types of biological tissues have been the target of extensive investigation, namely nacre from mollusk shells and bone, which are both high performance natural composites. Many mechanical and imaging techniques such as nanoindentation and atomic force microscopy are used to characterize these tissues. Although the degree of efficiency of biological hard tissues are yet unmatched by any man-made ceramic composites, some promising new techniques to synthesize them are currently under development. Not all mineralized tissues develop through normal physiologic processes and are beneficial to the organism. For example, kidney stones contain mineralized tissues that are developed through pathologic processes. Hence, biomineralization is an important process to understand how these diseases occur.

== Evolution ==
The evolution of mineralized tissues has been puzzling for more than a century. It has been hypothesized that the first mechanism of animal tissue mineralization began either in the oral skeleton of conodont or the dermal skeleton of early agnathans. The dermal skeleton is just surface dentin and basal bone, which is sometimes overlaid by enameloid. It is thought that the dermal skeleton eventually became scales, which are homologous to teeth. Teeth were first seen in chondrichthyans and were made from all three components of the dermal skeleton, namely dentin, basal bone and enameloid. The mineralization mechanism of mammalian tissue was later elaborated in actinopterygians and sarcopterygians during bony fish evolution. It is expected that genetic analysis of agnathans will provide more insight into the evolution of mineralized tissues and clarify evidence from early fossil records.

== Hierarchical structure ==
Hierarchical structures are distinct features seen throughout different length scales. To understand how the hierarchical structure of mineralized tissues contributes to their remarkable properties, those for nacre and bone are described below. Hierarchical structures are characteristic of biology and are seen in all structural materials in biology such as bone and nacre from seashells

=== Nacre ===
Nacre has several hierarchical structural levels.

==== The macroscale ====
Hierarchical structure: brick and mortar concept

Some mollusc shells protect themselves from predators by using a two layered system, one of which is nacre. Nacre constitutes the inner layer while the other, outer, layer is made from calcite. The latter is hard and thus prevents any penetration through the shell, but is subject to brittle failure. On the other hand, nacre is softer and can uphold inelastic deformations, which makes it tougher than the hard outer shell. The mineral found in nacre is aragonite, CaCO_{3}, and it occupies 95% vol. Nacre is 3000 times tougher than aragonite and this has to do with the other component in nacre, the one that takes up 5% vol., which is the softer organic biopolymers. Furthermore, the nacreous layer also contains some strands of weaker material called growth lines that can deflect cracks.

==== The microscale ====
The Microscale can be imagined by a three-dimensional brick and mortar wall. The bricks would be 0.5 μm thick layers of microscopic aragonite polygonal tablets approximately 5-8 μm in diameter. What holds the bricks together are the mortars and in the case of nacre, it is the 20-30 nm organic material that plays this role. Even though these tablets are usually illustrated as flat sheets, different microscopy techniques have shown that they are wavy in nature with amplitudes as large as half of the tablet's thickness. This waviness plays an important role in the fracture of nacre as it will progressively lock the tablets when they are pulled apart and induce hardening.

==== The nanoscale ====
The 30 nm thick interface between the tablets that connects them together and the aragonite grains detected by scanning electron microscopy from which the tablets themselves are made of together represent another structural level. The organic material "gluing" the tablets together is made of proteins and chitin.

To summarize, on the macroscale, the shell, its two layers (nacre and calcite), and weaker strands inside nacre represent three hierarchical structures. On the microscale, the stacked tablet layers and the wavy interface between them are two other hierarchical structures. Lastly, on the nanoscale, the connecting organic material between the tablets as well as the grains from which they are made of is the final sixth hierarchical structure in nacre.

=== Bone ===
Like nacre and the other mineralized tissues, bone has a hierarchical structure that is also formed by the self-assembly of smaller components. The mineral in bone (known as bone mineral) is hydroxyapatite with a lot of carbonate ions, while the organic portion is made mostly of collagen and some other proteins. The hierarchical structural of bone spans across to a three tiered hierarchy of the collagen molecule itself. Different sources report different numbers of hierarchical level in bone, which is a complex biological material. The types of mechanisms that operate at different structural length scales are yet to be properly defined. Five hierarchical structures of bone are presented below.

==== The macroscale ====
Compact bone and spongy bone are on a scale of several millimetres to 1 or more centimetres.

==== The microscale ====
There are two hierarchical structures on the microscale. The first, at a scale of 100 μm to 1 mm, is inside the compact bone where cylindrical units called osteons and small struts can be distinguished. The second hierarchical structure, the ultrastructure, at a scale of 5 to 10 μm, is the actual structure of the osteons and small struts.

==== The nanoscale ====
There are also two hierarchical structures on the nanoscale. The first being the structure inside the ultrastructure that are fibrils and extrafibrillar space, at a scale of several hundred nanometres. The second are the elementary components of mineralized tissues at a scale of tens of nanometres. The components are the mineral crystals of hydroxyapatite, cylindrical collagen molecules, organic molecules such as lipids and proteins, and finally water. The hierarchical structure common to all mineralized tissues is the key to their mechanical performance.

== Mineral component ==
The mineral is the inorganic component of mineralized tissues. This constituent is what makes the tissues harder and stiffer. Hydroxyapatite, calcium carbonate, silica, calcium oxalate, whitlockite, and monosodium urate are examples of minerals found in biological tissues. In mollusc shells, these minerals are carried to the site of mineralization in vesicles within specialized cells. Although they are in an amorphous mineral phase while inside the vesicles, the mineral destabilizes as it passes out of the cell and crystallizes. In bone, studies have shown that calcium phosphate nucleates within the hole area of the collagen fibrils and then grows in these zones until it occupies the maximum space.

== Organic component ==
The organic part of mineralized tissues is made of proteins. In bone for example, the organic layer is the protein collagen. The degree of mineral in mineralized tissues varies and the organic component occupies a smaller volume as tissue hardness increases. However, without this organic portion, the biological material would be brittle and break easily. Hence, the organic component of mineralized tissues increases their toughness. Moreover, many proteins are regulators in the mineralization process. They act in the nucleation or inhibition of hydroxyapatite formation. For example, the organic component in nacre is known to restrict the growth of aragonite. Some of the regulatory proteins in mineralized tissues are osteonectin, osteopontin, osteocalcin, bone sialoprotein and dentin phosphophoryn. In nacre, the organic component is porous, which allows the formation of mineral bridges responsible for the growth and order of the nacreous tablets.

== Formation of minerals ==
Understanding the formation of biological tissues is inevitable in order to properly reconstruct them artificially. Even if questions remain in some aspects and the mechanism of mineralization of many mineralized tissues need yet to be determined, there are some ideas about those of mollusc shell, bone and sea urchin.

=== Mollusk shell ===
The main structural elements involved in the mollusk shell formation process are: a hydrophobic silk gel, aspartic acid rich protein, and a chitin support. The silk gel is part of the protein portion and is mainly composed of glycine and alanine. It is not an ordered structure. The acidic proteins play a role in the configuration of the sheets. The chitin is highly ordered and is the framework of the matrix. The main elements of the overall are:

1. The silk gel fills the matrix to be mineralized before the mineralization takes place.
2. The highly ordered chitin determines the orientation of the crystals.
3. The components of the matrix are spatially distinguishable.
4. Amorphous calcium carbonate is the first form of the mineral.
5. Once nucleation begins on the matrix, the calcium carbonate turns into crystals.
6. While crystals grow, some of the acidic proteins get trapped within them.

=== Bone ===
In bone, mineralization starts from a heterogeneous solution having calcium and phosphate ions. The mineral nucleates, inside the hole area of the collagen fibrils, as thin layers of calcium phosphate, which then grow to occupy the maximum space available there. The mechanisms of mineral deposition within the organic portion of the bone are still under investigation. Three possible suggestions are that nucleation is either due to the precipitation of calcium phosphate solution, caused by the removal of biological inhibitors or occurs because of the interaction of calcium-binding proteins.

=== Sea urchin embryo ===
The sea urchin embryo has been used extensively in developmental biology studies. The larvae form a sophisticated endoskeleton that is made of two spicules. Each of the spicules is a single crystal of mineral calcite. The latter is a result of the transformation of amorphous CaCO_{3} to a more stable form. Therefore, there are two mineral phases in larval spicule formation.

== Organic-inorganic interface ==
The mineral-protein interface with its underlying adhesion forces is involved in the toughening properties of mineralized tissues. The interaction in the organic-inorganic interface is important to understand these toughening properties.

At the interface, a very large force (>6-5 nN) is needed to pull the protein molecules away from the aragonite mineral in nacre, despite the fact that the molecular interactions are non-bonded. Some studies perform a finite element model analysis to investigate the behaviour of the interface. A model has shown that during tension, the back stress that is induced during the plastic stretch of the material plays a big role in the hardening of the mineralized tissue. As well, the nanoscale asperities that is on the tablet surfaces provide resistance to interlamellar sliding and so strengthen the material. A surface topology study has shown that progressive tablet locking and hardening, which are needed for spreading large deformations over large volumes, occurred because of the waviness of the tablets.

== Diseased mineralized tissues ==
In vertebrates, mineralized tissues not only develop through normal physiological processes, but can also be involved in pathological processes. Some diseased areas that include the appearance of mineralized tissues include atherosclerotic plaques, tumoral calcinosis, juvenile dermatomyositis, kidney and salivary stones. All physiologic deposits contain the mineral hydroxyapatite or one analogous to it. Imaging techniques such as infrared spectroscopy are used to provide information on the type of mineral phase and changes in mineral and matrix composition involved in the disease. Also, clastic cells are cells that cause mineralized tissue resorption. If there is an unbalance of clastic cell, this will disrupt resorptive activity and cause diseases. One of the studies involving mineralized tissues in dentistry is on the mineral phase of dentin in order to understand its alteration with aging. These alterations lead to "transparent" dentin, which is also called sclerotic. It was shown that a dissolution and reprecipitation mechanism reigns the formation of transparent dentin. The causes and cures of these conditions can possibly be found from further studies on the role of the mineralized tissues involved.

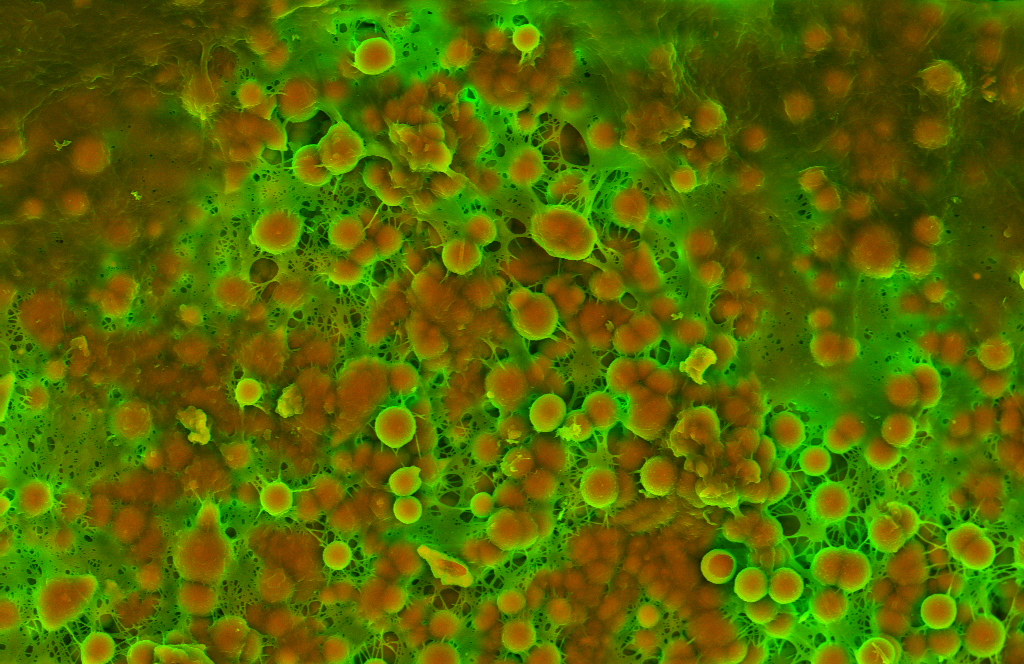
Density-Dependent Colour Scanning Electron Micrograph SEM (DDC-SEM) of cardiovascular calcification, showing in orange calcium phosphate spherical particles (denser material) and, in green, the extracellular matrix (less dense material).

== Bioinspired materials ==
Natural structural materials comprising hard and soft phases arranged in elegant hierarchical multiscale architectures, usually exhibit a combination of superior mechanical properties. For instance, many natural mechanical materials (Bone, Nacre, Teeth, Silk, and Bamboo) are lightweight, strong, flexible, tough, fracture-resistant, and self-repair. The general underlying mechanism behind such advanced materials is that the highly oriented stiff components give the materials great mechanical strength and stiffness, while the soft matrix "glues" the stiff components and transfer the stress to them. Moreover, the controlled plastic deformation of the soft matrix during fracture provides an additional toughening mechanism. Such a common strategy was perfected by nature itself over millions of years of evolution, giving us the inspiration for building the next generation of structural materials. There are several techniques used to mimic these tissues. Some of the current techniques are described here.

=== Large scale model materials ===
The large scale model of materials is based on the fact that crack deflection is an important toughening mechanism of nacre. This deflection happens because of the weak interfaces between the aragonite tiles. Systems on the macroscopic scales are used to imitate these week interfaces with layered composite ceramic tablets that are held together by weak interface "glue". Hence, these large scale models can overcome the brittleness of ceramics. Since other mechanisms like tablet locking and damage spreading also play a role in the toughness of nacre, other models assemblies inspired by the waviness of microstructure of nacre have also been devised on the large scale.

=== Biomimetic mineralization ===
All hard materials in animals are achieved by the biomineralization process - dedicated cells deposit minerals to a soft polymeric (protein) matrix to strengthen, harden and/or stiffen it. Thus, biomimetic mineralization is an obvious and effective process for building synthetic materials with superior mechanical properties. The general strategy is started with organic scaffolds with ion-binding sites that promote heterogeneous nucleation. Then localized mineralization can be achieved by controlled ion supersaturation on these ion-binding sites. In such a composite material, mineral function as a highly strong and highly wear- and erosion-resistant surface layer. While the soft organic scaffolds provide a tough load-bearing base to accommodate excessive strains.

=== Ice templation/Freeze casting ===
Ice temptation/Freeze casting is a new method that uses the physics of ice formation to develop a layered-hybrid material. Specifically, ceramic suspensions are directionally frozen under conditions designed to promote the formation of lamellar ice crystals, which expel the ceramic particles as they grow. After sublimation of the water, this results in a layered homogeneous ceramic scaffold that, architecturally, is a negative replica of the ice. The scaffold can then be filled with a second soft phase so as to create a hard–soft layered composite. This strategy is also widely applied to build other kinds of bioinspired materials, like extremely strong and tough hydrogels, metal/ceramic, and polymer/ceramic hybrid biomimetic materials with fine lamellar or brick-and-mortar architectures. The "brick" layer is extremely strong but brittle and the soft "mortar" layer between the bricks generates limited deformation, thereby allowing for the relief of locally high stresses while also providing ductility without too much loss in strength.

=== Additive manufacturing ===
Additive manufacturing encompasses a family of technologies that draw on computer designs to build structures layer by layer. Recently, a lot of bioinspired materials with elegant hierarchical motifs have been built with features ranging in size from tens of micrometers to one submicrometer. Therefore, the crack of materials only can happen and propagate on the microscopic scale, which wouldn't lead to the fracture of the whole structure. However, the time-consuming of manufacturing the hierarchical mechanical materials, especially on the nano- and micro-scale limited the further application of this technique in large-scale manufacturing.

=== Layer-by-layer deposition ===
Layer-by-layer deposition is a technique that as suggested by its name consists of a layer-by-layer assembly to make multilayered composites like nacre. Some examples of efforts in this direction include alternating layers of hard and soft components of TiN/Pt with an ion beam system. The composites made by this sequential deposition technique do not have a segmented layered microstructure. Thus, sequential adsorption has been proposed to overcome this limitation and consists of repeatedly adsorbing electrolytes and rinsing the tablets, which results in multilayers.

=== Thin film deposition: microfabricated structures ===
Thin film deposition focuses on reproducing the cross-lamellar microstructure of conch instead of mimicking the layered structure of nacre using micro-electro mechanical systems (MEMS). Among mollusk shells, the conch shell has the highest degree of structural organization. The mineral aragonite and organic matrix are replaced by polysilicon and photoresist. The MEMS technology repeatedly deposits a thin silicon film. The interfaces are etched by reactive ion etching and then filled with photoresist. There are three films deposited consecutively. Although the MEMS technology is expensive and more time-consuming, there is a high degree of control over the morphology and large numbers of specimens can be made.

=== Self-assembly ===
The method of self-assembly tries to reproduce not only the properties, but also the processing of bioceramics. In this process, raw materials readily available in nature are used to achieve stringent control of nucleation and growth. This nucleation occurs on a synthetic surface with some success. The technique occurs at low temperature and in an aqueous environment. Self-assembling films form templates that effect the nucleation of ceramic phases. The downside with this technique is its inability to form a segmented layered microstructure. Segmentation is an important property of nacre used for crack deflection of the ceramic phase without fracturing it. As a consequence, this technique does not mimic microstructural characteristics of nacre beyond the layered organic/inorganic layered structure and requires further investigation.

== The future ==
The various studies have increased progress towards understanding mineralized tissues. However, it is still unclear which micro/nanostructural features are essential to the material performance of these tissues. Also constitutive laws along various loading paths of the materials are currently unavailable. For nacre, the role of some nanograins and mineral bridges requires further studies to be fully defined. Successful biomimicking of mollusk shells will depend on gaining further knowledge of all these factors, especially the selection of influential materials in the performance of mineralized tissues. Also the final technique used for artificial reproduction must be both cost effective and scalable industrially.

== See also ==
- Shell growth in estuaries
- Biomineralization

== Bibliography ==
- T.G. Bromage (1991). "Issues related to mineralized tissue biology in human evolutionary research". Human Evolution. 6 (12): 165–174. doi:10.1007/BF02435617. S2CID 83595216.
- Neuendorf R.E.; Saiz E.; Pearce E.I.; Tomsia A.P. & R.O. Ritchie (2008). "Adhesion between biodegradable polymers and hydroxyapatite: Relevance to synthetic bone-like materials and tissue engineering scaffolds" (PDF). Acta Biomaterialia. 4 (5): 1288–1296. doi:10.1016/j.actbio.2008.04.006. PMID 18485842.
- Kruzic J.J. & R.O. Ritchie (2007). "Fatigue of mineralized tissues: Cortical bone and dentin" (PDF). Mechanical Behavior of Biomedical Materials. I (1): 3–17. doi:10.1016/j.jmbbm.2007.04.002. PMID 19627767.
- Belcherab A.M.; Hansmad P.K.; Stuckyac G.D. & D.E. Morsebe (1998). "First steps in harnessing the potential of biomineralization as a route to new high-performance composite materials". Acta Materialia (abstract). 46 (3): 733–736. doi:10.1016/S1359-6454(97)00253-X.
- Jäger I. & P. Fratzl (2000). "Mineralized Collagen Fibrils: A Mechanical Model with a Staggered Arrangement of Mineral Particles". Biophysical. 79 (4): 1737–1746. Bibcode:2000BpJ....79.1737J. doi:10.1016/S0006-3495(00)76426-5. PMC 1301068. PMID 11023882.
- Fantner G.E.; Hassenkam T.; Kindt J.H.; Weaver J.C.; Birkedal H.; Pechenik L.; Cutroni J.A.; Cidade G.A.G.; Stucky G.D.; Morse D.E. & P.K. Hansma (2005). "Sacrificial bonds and hidden length dissipate energy as mineralized fibrils separate during bone fracture". Nature Materials. 4 (8): 612–616. Bibcode:2005NatMa...4..612F. doi:10.1038/nmat1428. PMID 16025123. S2CID 20835743.
- Yao W.; Cheng Z.; Koester K.J.; Ager J.W.; Balooch M.; Pham A.; Chefo S.; Busse C.; Ritchie R.O. & N.E. Lane (2007). "The degree of bone mineralization is maintained with single intravenous bisphosphonates in aged estrogen-deficient rats and is a strong predictor of bone strength" (PDF). Bone. 41 (5): 804–812. doi:10.1016/j.bone.2007.06.021. PMC 3883569. PMID 17825637.
- Nakamura H.K.; Chiou W.-A.; Saruwatari L.; Aita H. & T. Ogawa (2005). "The Microstructure of Mineralized Tissue on Titanium Implant Interface". Microscopy and Microanalysis. 11: 184–185. doi:10.1017/S143192760550833X.
- U. Ripamonti (2003). "Sculpturing the architecture of mineralized tissues: soluble, insoluble and geometric signals" (PDF). European Cells & Materials. 5: 29–30.
- M.H. Shamos (1965). "The Origin of Bioelectric Effects in Mineralized Tissues". Dental Research. 44 (6): 1114–1115. doi:10.1177/00220345650440060901. PMID 5216237. S2CID 45177549.
- J. Currey (2001). "Biomaterials: Sacrificial bonds heal bone". Nature. 414 (6865): 699. Bibcode:2001Natur.414..699C. doi:10.1038/414699a. PMID 11742376. S2CID 4387468.
- Vinn, O., ten Hove, H.A. and Mutvei, H. (2008). "Ultrastructure and mineral composition of serpulid tubes (Polychaeta, Annelida)". Zoological Journal of the Linnean Society. 154 (4): 633–650. doi:10.1111/j.1096-3642.2008.00421.x.
- Vinn, O. (2013). "Occurrence, Formation and Function of Organic Sheets in the Mineral Tube Structures of Serpulidae (Polychaeta, Annelida)". PLOS ONE. 8 (10) e75330. Bibcode:2013PLoSO...875330V. doi:10.1371/journal.pone.0075330. PMC 3792063. PMID 24116035.
