= Dentinogenesis =

Formation of dentin during tooth development

In animal tooth development, dentinogenesis is the formation of dentin, a substance that forms the majority of teeth. Dentinogenesis is performed by odontoblasts, which are a special type of biological cell on the outer wall of dental pulps, and it begins at the late bell stage of a tooth development. The different stages of dentin formation after differentiation of the cell result in different types of dentin: mantle dentin, primary dentin, secondary dentin, and tertiary dentin.

== Odontoblast differentiation ==
Odontoblasts differentiate from cells of the dental papilla. This is an expression of signaling molecules and growth factors of the inner enamel epithelium (IEE).

== Formation of mantle dentin ==
They begin secreting an organic matrix around the area directly adjacent to the IEE, closest to the area of the future cusp of a tooth. The organic matrix contains collagen fibers with large diameters (0.1-0.2 μm in diameter). The odontoblasts begin to move toward the center of the tooth, forming an extension called the odontoblast process. Thus, dentin formation proceeds toward the inside of the tooth. The odontoblast process causes the secretion of hydroxyapatite crystals and mineralization of the matrix (mineralisation occurs due to matrix vesicles). This area of mineralization is known as mantle dentin and is a layer usually about 20-150 μm thick.

== Formation of primary dentin ==
Whereas mantle dentin forms from the preexisting ground substance of the dental papilla, primary dentin forms through a different process. Odontoblasts increase in size, eliminating the availability of any extracellular resources to contribute to an organic matrix for mineralization. Additionally, the larger odontoblasts cause collagen to be secreted in smaller amounts, which results in more tightly arranged, heterogeneous nucleation that is used for mineralization. Other materials (such as lipids, phosphoproteins, and phospholipids) are also secreted. There is some dispute about the control of mineralization during dentinogenesis.

The dentin in the root of a tooth forms only after the presence of Hertwig epithelial root sheath (HERS), near the cervical loop of the enamel organ. Root dentin is considered different from dentin found in the crown of the tooth (known as coronal dentin) because of the different orientation of collagen fibers, as well as the possible decrease of phosphophoryn levels and less mineralization.

Maturation of dentin or mineralization of predentin occurs soon after its apposition, which takes place two phases: primary and secondary. Initially, the calcium hydroxyapatite crystals form as globules, or calcospherules, in the collagen fibers of the predentin, which allows for both the expansion and fusion during the primary mineralization phase. Later, new areas of mineralization occur as globules form in the partially mineralized predentin during the secondary mineralization phase. These new areas of crystal formation are more or less regularly layered on the initial crystals, allowing them to expand, although they fuse incompletely.

In areas where both primary and secondary mineralization have occurred with complete crystalline fusion, these appear as lighter rounded areas on a stained section of dentin and are considered globular dentin. In contrast, the darker arclike areas in a stained section of dentin are considered interglobular dentin. In these areas, only primary mineralization has occurred within the predentin, and the globules of dentin do not fuse completely. Thus, interglobular dentin is slightly less mineralized than globular dentin. Interglobular dentin is especially evident in coronal dentin, near the DEJ, and in certain dental anomalies, such as in dentin dysplasia.

== Formation of secondary dentin ==
Secondary dentin is formed after root formation is finished and occurs at a much slower rate. It is not formed at a uniform rate along the tooth, but instead forms faster along sections closer to the crown of a tooth. This development continues throughout life and accounts for the smaller areas of pulp found in older individuals.

== Formation of tertiary dentin ==
Tertiary dentin is deposited at specific sites in response to injury by odontoblasts or replacement odontoblasts from the pulp depending on the severity of the injury. Tertiary dentin can be divided into reactionary or reparative dentin. Reactionary dentin is formed by odontoblasts when the injury does not damage the odontoblast layer. Reparative dentin is formed by replacement odontoblasts when the injury is so severe that it damages a part of the primary odontoblast layer. Thus a type of tertiary dentin forms in reaction to stimuli, such as attrition or dental caries.

== See also ==
- Odontoblasts
- Dentin
- Animal tooth development
- Human tooth development
- Dentinogenesis imperfecta
