= Tertiary dentin =

Dentin which forms in a tooth as a reaction to trauma

Tertiary dentin (including reparative dentin or sclerotic dentin) is a form of dentin, one of the main component materials of teeth. It forms as a reaction to stimulation, including caries, wear and fractures. Tertiary dentin is therefore a mechanism for a tooth to 'heal', with new material formation protecting the pulp chamber and ultimately therefore protecting the tooth and individual against abscesses and infection. This form of dentin can be easily distinguished on the surface of a tooth, and is much darker in appearance compared to primary dentin. Tertiary dentin will often not be visible on the surface of a tooth, but because it is more dense it can be viewed on a Micro-CT scan of the tooth.

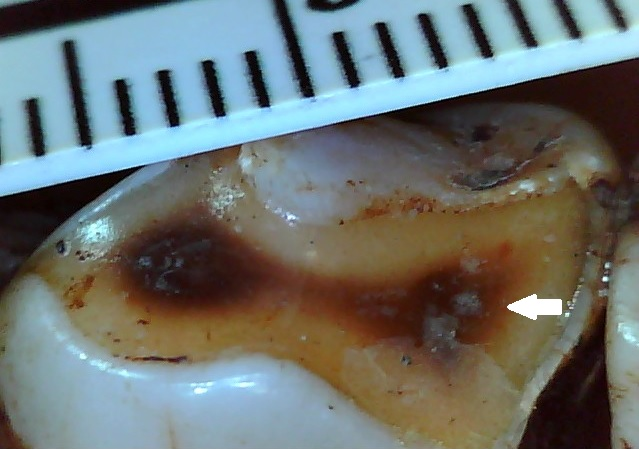
Tertiary dentin on the surface of a gorilla tooth. The darker area indicated by the white arrow is tertiary dentin and has formed as a response to tooth wear.

Wear on the surface of a tooth can lead to the exposure of the underlying dentin. When wear is severe tertiary dentin may form to help protect the pulp chamber. Frequency of tertiary dentin in different species of primate suggests teeth 'heal' at different rates in different species. Gorillas have a high rate of tertiary dentin formation, with over 90% of worn teeth showing tertiary dentin. Hominins have a much lower rate of tertiary dentin formation, with around 15% of teeth that have dentin exposed through wear showing tertiary dentin formation. Chimpanzees have rates in between gorillas and humans, with 47% of worn teeth showing 'healing'.

Clinical studies have researched the properties of tertiary dentin formation, including anatomy in both humans and animal models, usually from an oral health perspective. Genetic changes in animal models can increase tertiary dentin production. This suggests certain species may have evolved to produce tertiary dentin in response to dietary changes. For example, gorillas may have evolved high rates of tertiary dentin as protection against severe wear, since they consume a lot of tough vegetation.
