= Dentin sialophosphoprotein =

Precursor protein for other proteins found in the teeth

DSPP

Identifiers
- Aliases: DSPP, DFNA39, DGI1, DMP3, DPP, DSP, DTDP2, Dentin sialophosphoprotein
- External IDs: OMIM: 125485; MGI: 109172; GeneCards: DSPP

Gene location (Human)
Chr.	Chromosome 4 (human)
Band	4q22.1	Start	87,608,529 bp
Band	4q22.1	End	87,616,873 bp

Gene location (Mouse)
Chr.	Chromosome 5 (mouse)
Band	5 E5|5 50.59 cM	Start	104,318,578 bp
Band	5 E5|5 50.59 cM	End	104,327,993 bp
RNA expression pattern
Bgee	Human / Mouse (ortholog); Top expressed in: buccal mucosa cell; tendon of biceps brachii; myocardium; internal globus pallidus; epithelium of esophagus; dorsal motor nucleus of vagus nerve; lower lobe of lung; cerebellar vermis; nipple; trabecular bone / Top expressed in: tooth; molar; dental pulp; CA3 field; central gray substance of midbrain; nucleus of stria terminalis; hippocampus proper; hypothalamus; pituitary gland; More reference expression data
BioGPS	More reference expression data
Gene ontology
Molecular function	calcium ion binding; extracellular matrix structural constituent; collagen binding; protein binding
Cellular component	cytoplasm; extracellular region; extracellular matrix; nucleus
Biological process	multicellular organism development; skeletal system development; biomineral tissue development; extracellular matrix organization; ossification; regulation of odontoblast differentiation; response to hypoxia; response to mechanical stimulus; response to carbohydrate; cellular response to hormone stimulus; hair follicle maturation; cartilage development; positive regulation of enamel mineralization; cellular response to cell-matrix adhesion; cellular response to dexamethasone stimulus; response to transforming growth factor beta; odontoblast differentiation; dentinogenesis
Sources:Amigo / QuickGO
Orthologs
Databases	NCBI: entry; OMA: entry
Species	Human	Mouse
Entrez	1834	666279
Ensembl	ENSG00000152591	ENSMUSG00000053268
UniProt	Q9NZW4	E9Q9Z9
RefSeq (mRNA)	NM_014208	NM_010080
RefSeq (protein)	NP_055023	NP_034210
Location (UCSC)	Chr 4: 87.61 – 87.62 Mb	Chr 5: 104.32 – 104.33 Mb
PubMed search
- Wikidata
View/Edit Human	View/Edit Mouse

Dentin sialophosphoprotein is a precursor protein for other proteins found in the teeth. It is produced by cells (odontoblasts) inside the teeth (dental pulp), and in smaller quantities by bone tissues (osteoblasts and osteocytes). It is required for normal hardening (mineralisation) of teeth. During teeth development, it is broken down into three proteins such as dentin sialoprotein (DSP), dentin glycoprotein (DGP), and dentin phosphoprotein (DPP). These proteins become the major non-collagenous components of teeth. Their distribution in the collagen matrix of the forming dentin suggests these proteins play an important role in the regulation of mineral deposition. Additional evidence for this correlation is phenotypically manifested in patients with mutant forms of dentin sialophosphoprotein. Such patients suffer dental anomalies including type III dentinogenesis imperfecta.

It is coded by a gene of the same name (dentin sialophosphoprotein, or DSPP) present on human chromosome 4. This gene encodes two principal proteins of the dentin extracellular matrix of the tooth. The preproprotein is secreted by odontoblasts and cleaved into dentin sialoprotein and dentin phosphoprotein. Dentin phosphoprotein is thought to be involved in the biomineralization process of dentin. Mutations in this gene have been associated with dentinogenesis imperfecta-1; in some individuals, dentinogenesis imperfecta occurs in combination with an autosomal dominant form of deafness. Allelic differences due to repeat polymorphisms have been found for this gene.
