= Dentin phosphoprotein =

Protein involved in dentin formation within teeth

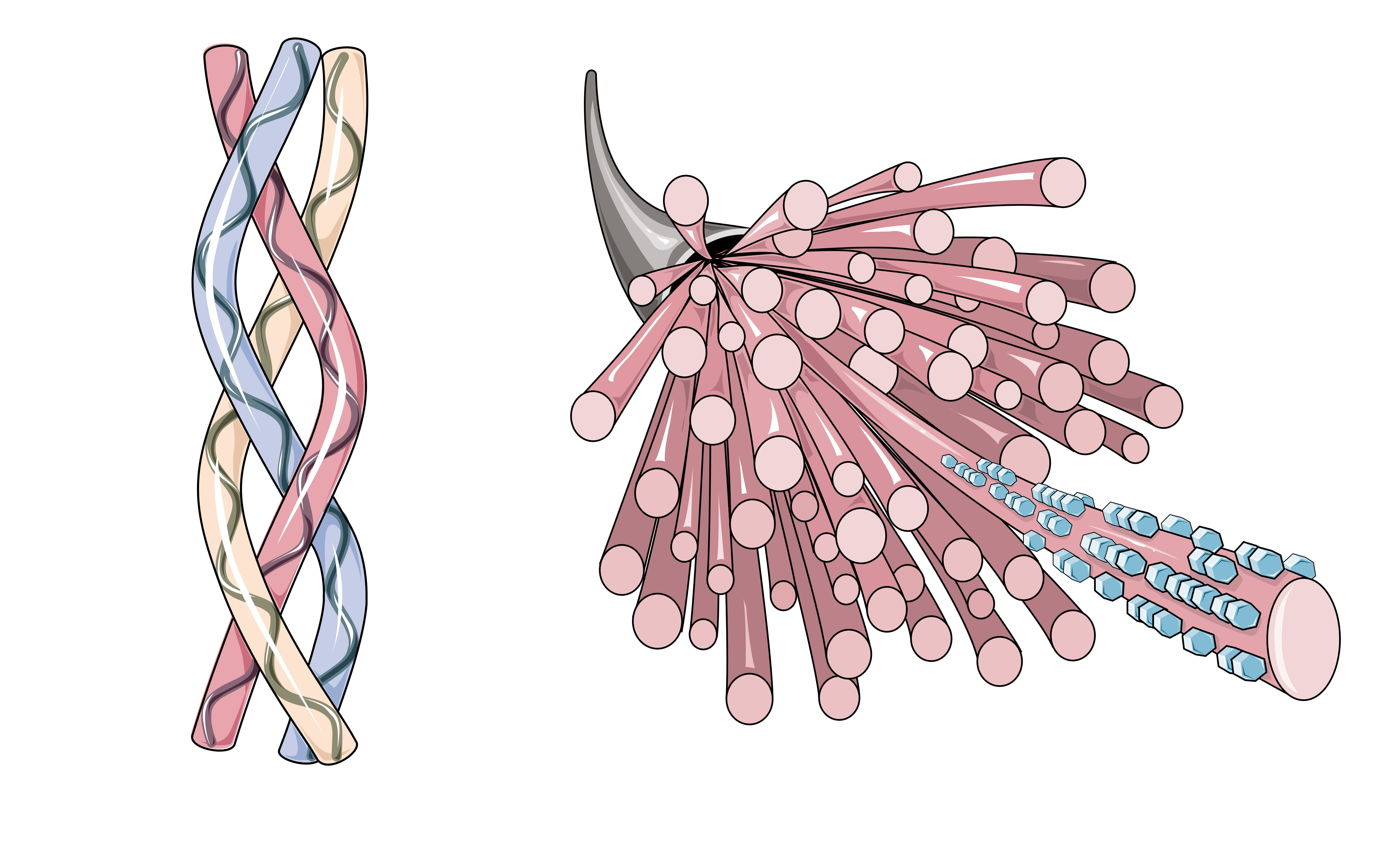

Dentin phosphoprotein (DPP), also known as phosphophoryn, is one of three vital extracellular matrix proteins formed from post-translational processing of the dentin sialophosphoprotein (DSPP) compound. DSPP is created and secreted by odontoblasts, which are specialized cells in charge of producing dentin during the process of odontogenesis. It is very important in the regulation of mineralization of dentin, one of the main constituent materials of teeth. When secretion is occurring, DSPP goes through a particular proteolytic cleavage to generate a total of three proteins. The other two proteins cleaved by DSPP are dentin sialoprotein (DSP) and dentin glycoprotein (DGP). When applying mineralization and taking a look at these three proteins, DPP is the most generous and has the highest functionally significant. It has a crucial role in the regulation and initiation in the process of mineralization of dentin. Dentin is necessary for the development of the rigid, helpful structure that is underneath the enamel in mature teeth. Since dentin is one of the main materials that compose teeth and provides strength, knowing the properties of DPP is crucial for acknowledging new strategies for biomimetic tissue engineering, the process in which the teeth develop, and dental diseases that are inherited throughout individuals.

The coding region causes DPP to have variability in protein length among individuals. The variability within this protein demonstrates intrinsic structural flexibility and is an extensively phosphorylated protein. This belongs to a class of intrinsically disordered proteins also known as IDPs. These proteins are not able to be synthesized into secondary and tertiary structures because they will not be stable so they carry on as flexible and powerful which permits these proteins to connect with several molecular pairs. DPP is able to maintain its function to directly mineralize while also having a its disordered state and being capable to undergo extreme phosphorylation because of its small size and how the composition of the element can vary notably between each individual.

Phosphophoryn is the carboxyl-terminal fragment of DSPP. Before dentin sialophosphoprotein becomes cleaved the order of components in the precursor molecule are DSP-DGP-DPP. This indicated that DPP is found in the far end of the protein prior to being processed. Once the protein is cleaved, the other two proteins, DSP and DGP, only take part in the initial process of the matrix organization. DPP demonstrates its results during the beginning and development of dentin mineralization. It is the most acidic protein ever discovered in the biology of vertebrates and has an extremely low isoelectric point of 1. This extreme acidity is achieved by its amino acid sequence. Many portions of its chain are repeating −D−S−S− (aspartic acid-serine-serine) sequences. In this situation, the serine is quite often phosphorylated. On the other hand, the aspartic acid typically contributes to a consistent negative charge. In protein chemistry, net acidity equates to a negative electrostatic charge. Being highly negative, dentin phosphoprotein is able to attract large amounts of calcium with high infinity. In vitro studies also indicate phosphophoryn can initiate hydroxyapatite crystal formation which validates its principal role in the biomineralization of dentin.

== Tooth Development and Odontoblasts ==
DPP is created at the initial stage in mineralization. This is the boundary between unmineralized prevention and the new and improved formation of dentin. Since it distributes spaciously, it will determine where the mineral will form and how quickly the process of mineralization will progress. During the process of teeth developing, DPP will become highly concentrated around dentinal tubules which will form patters that demonstrates the odontoblast process.

Odontoblasts will elongate the long process of cytoplasmic into prevention during the development of teeth. DPP is produced into a microenvironment that guides hydroxyapatite formation around the processes of odontoblast. This will then form the tubular structural characteristic of dentin. The different variations of the production of DPP during the creation of teeth can alter the thickness, hardness, and microstructure of dentin.

== Experimental Visualization and Staining ==
Scientist have the ability to analyze the distribution of DPP by using a variation of histological and biochemical techniques. Antibody labeling methods, immunofluorescence, in situ hybridization, and staining with gels open up opportunities of researchers to envision the location of DPP within the dentin matrix while it is developing. These studies have been able to prove that DPP is located in the early mineralization stages with collagen fibrils. Another study has shown that DPP gathers near odontoblasts processes and dentinal tubules. One study shows that DPP is not distributed in a uniform technique but rather is concentration differs based on the developmental phase. With all these different studies, researchers are able to prove that different species have different tooth mineralization patterns therefore, the distribution of DPP will develop according to what it needed for that particular species.

== Clinical Significance ==
There are many clinical significances that can be seen with Dentin phosphoprotein and dental disease as a whole many of which can have major impacts. The irregular development and structure of Dentin phosphoprotein or DPP is known to lead to massive and noticeable changes in Dentin. An example of this is poor mineral content and disposition that leads to weak Dentin. The weak dentin results in a failure to provide support for enamel as well as for the pulp on and around the teeth

== Biomimetics and Regenerative Medicine ==
Since DPP is a very impactful mineralization agent, scientists have testes the hypothesis of tissue engineering. When producing models that include repeating peptides sequences such as those in DPP, this process has allowed promotion of remineralization of carious lesions. These peptides that are inspired by DPP can bind with calcium and phosphate ions and rebuild mineral on the demineralized surfaces of dentin. Along with enhancing the strength of the bond in restorative dentistry and assists as a platform in regenerative endodontic procedures.

In the processes of regenerative dentistry, DPP has been assessed as a signaling molecule to restore the differentiation in odontoblast from stem cells. The appearance of this allows stem cell derived odontoblast like cells to release mineralized matrix that is equivalent to a natural form on dentin. According to MacDougall (1997), the extracellular matrix proteins in dentin are expressed as a single coded cDNA transcript that is able to be cleaved into two polypeptides that have unique structural characteristics. These applications of DPP call attention to how crucial this protein can be to future clinical therapies.

== Role of Dentin Mineralization ==
DPP, or Dentin phosphoprotein, contributes to three crucial roles of the process of Dentin's formation. The Dentin phosphoprotein is negatively charged and dense as a structure that attracts a stable calcium ion known as Ca2+ from its surrounding extracellular environment. As the levels of calcium are increased other ions such as phosphate ions are attracted to the structure. This allows DPP to begin to cluster with the ions and acts as a nucleation area. These nucleation areas are key to allow the formation of hydroxyapatite crystals. Dentin phosphoprotein is necessary for mineralization for without it, mineralization can be irregular and inefficient.
