= Pulp (tooth) =

Innermost layer of a tooth

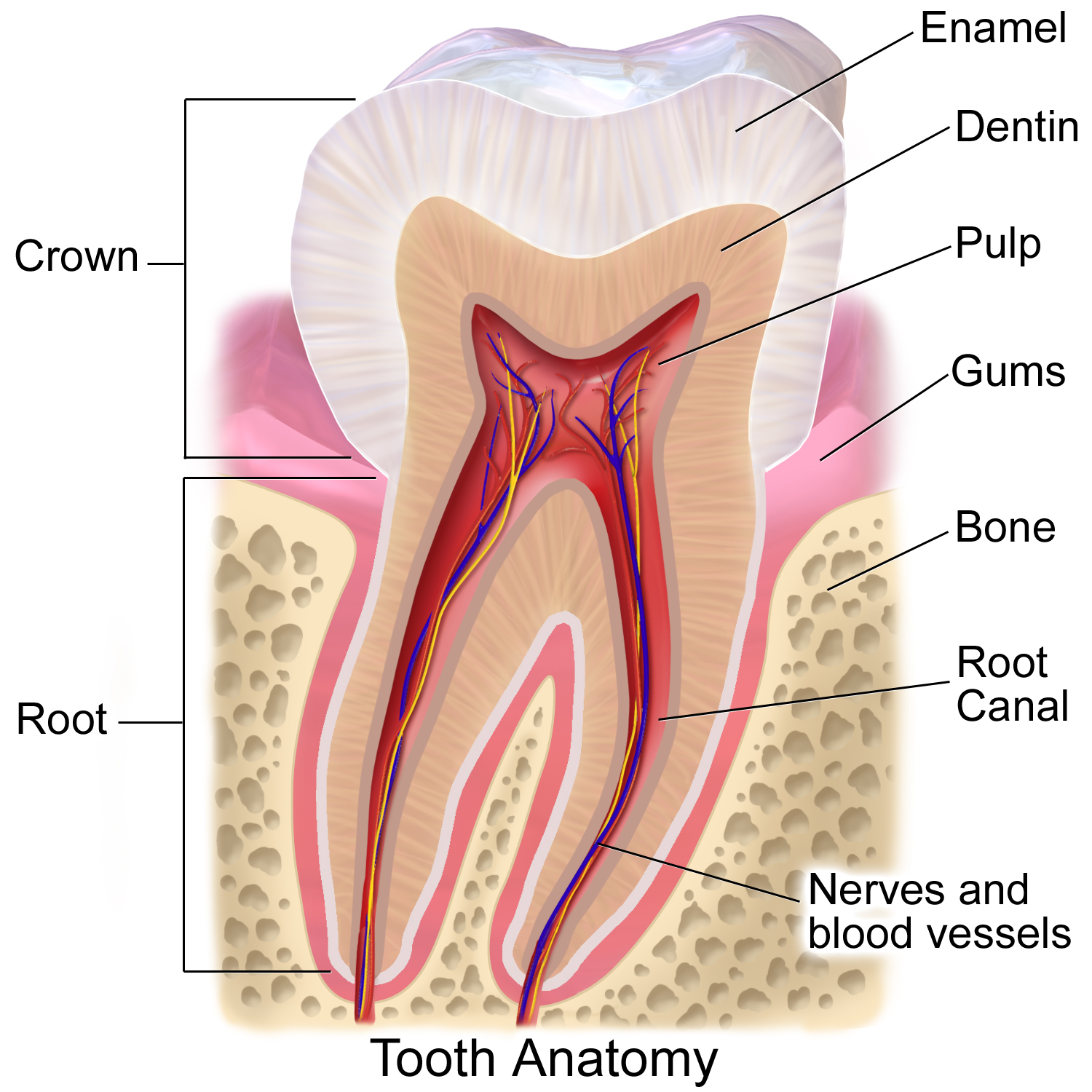
- Section of a human molar

Details

Identifiers
- Latin: pulpa dentis
- MeSH: D003782
- TA98: A05.1.03.051
- TA2: 934
- FMA: 55631

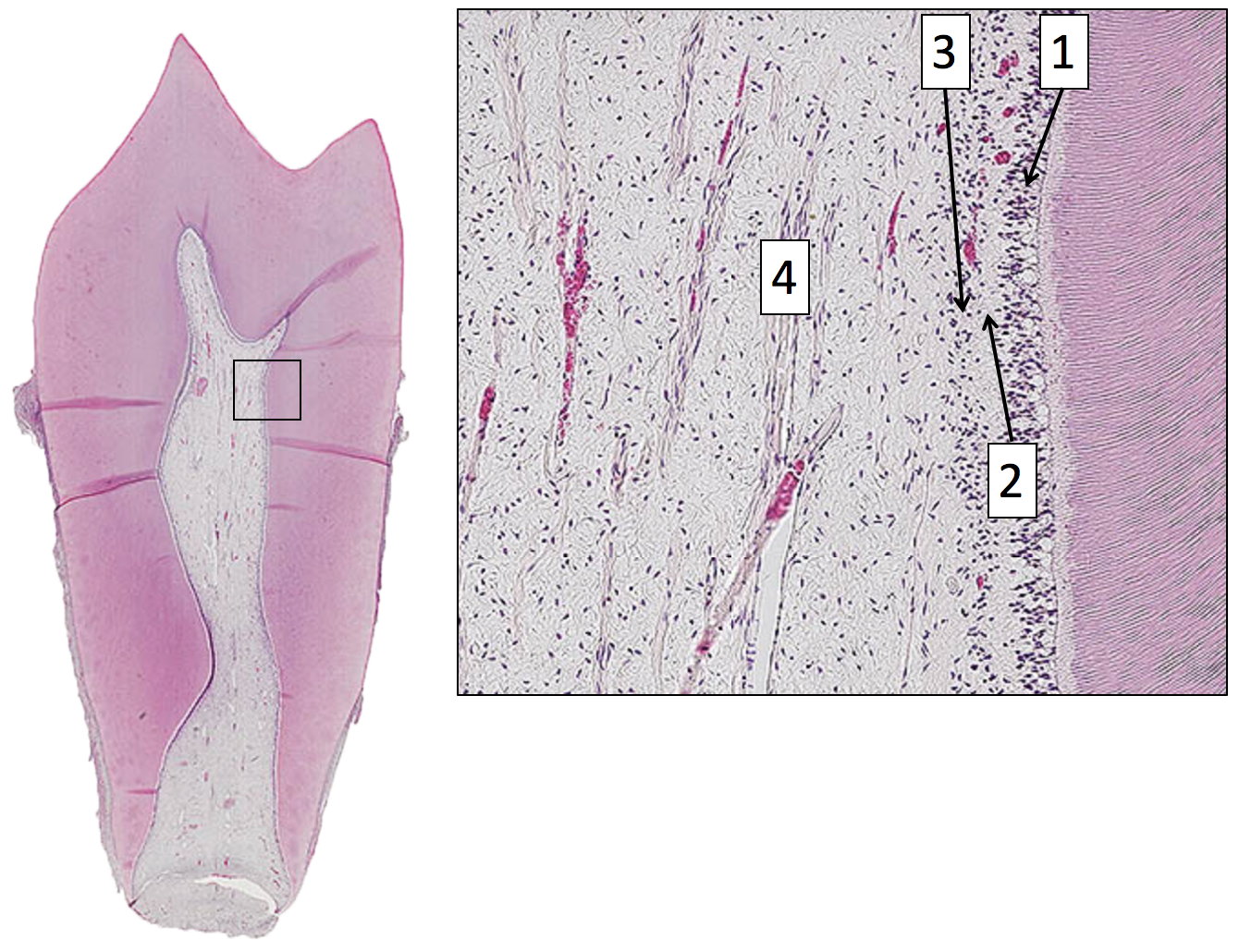
Diagram showing pulp histology: 1. Odontoblast layer; 2. Cell-free zone of Weil; 3. Cell-rich zone; 4. Pulp core

The pulp is the connective tissue, nerves, blood vessels, and odontoblasts that comprise the innermost layer of a tooth. The pulp's activity and signalling processes regulate its behaviour.

== Anatomy ==
The pulp is the neurovascular bundle central to each tooth, permanent or primary. It is composed of a central pulp chamber, pulp horns, and radicular canals. The large mass of the pulp is contained within the pulp chamber, which is contained in and mimics the overall shape of the crown of the tooth. Because of the continuous deposition of the dentine, the pulp chamber becomes smaller with the age. This is not uniform throughout the coronal pulp but progresses faster on the floor than on the roof or sidewalls.

Radicular pulp canals extend down from the cervical region of the crown to the root apex. They are not always straight but vary in shape, size, and number. They are continuous with the periapical tissues through the apical foramen or foramina.

The total volume of all the permanent teeth organs is 0.38cc, and the mean volume of a single adult human pulp is 0.02cc.

Accessory canals are pathways from the radicular pulp. These canals, which extend laterally through the dentin to the periodontal tissue, are seen especially in the apical third of the root. Accessory canals are also called lateral canals because they are usually located on the lateral surface of the roots of the teeth.

== Development ==
The pulp has a background similar to that of dentin because both are derived from the dental papilla of the tooth germ. During odontogenesis, when the dentin forms around the dental papilla, the innermost tissue is considered pulp.

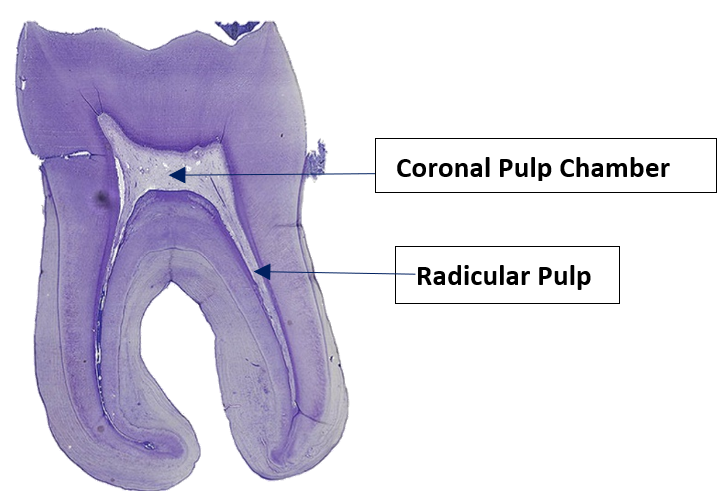
SDEO: Dental pulp of a stained and decalcified tooth.

There are 4 main stages of tooth development:

1. Bud stage
2. Cap stage
3. Bell stage
4. Crown stage

The first sign of tooth development is known to be as early as the 6th week of intrauterine life. The oral epithelium begins to multiply and invaginates into ectomesenchyme cells, which gives rise to dental lamina. The dental lamina is the origin of the tooth bud. The bud stage progresses to the cap stage when the epithelium forms the enamel organ. The ectomesenchyme cells condense further and become dental papilla. Together the epithelial enamel organ and ectomesenchymal dental papilla and follicle form the tooth germ. The dental papilla is the origin of dental pulp. Cells at the periphery of the dental papilla undergo cell division and differentiation to become odontoblasts. Pulpoblasts form in the middle of the pulp. This completes the formation of the pulp. The dental pulp is essentially a mature dental papilla.

The development of dental pulp can also be split into two stages: coronal pulp development (near the crown of the tooth) and root pulp development (apex of the tooth).

The pulp develops in four regions from the periphery to the central pulp:

1. Odontoblast layer
2. Cell-free zone – likely to be an artefact
3. Cell-rich zone
4. Pulp core

== Internal structure ==
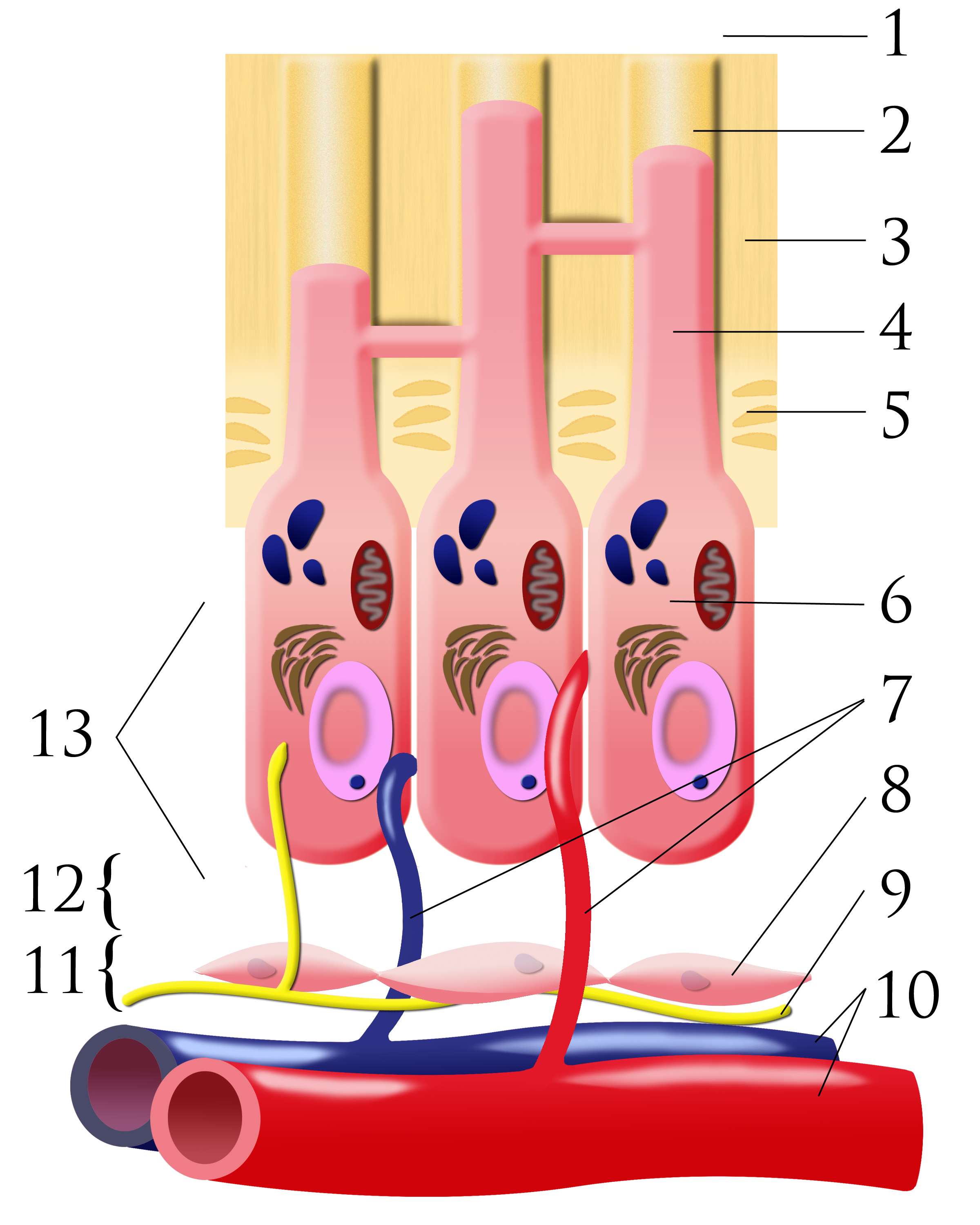
Pulpal dentin junction.: 1. outside tooth/enamel; 2. dentin tubule; 3. dentin; 4. odontoblastic process; 5. predentin; 6. odontoblast; 7. capillaries; 8. fibroblasts; 9. nerve; 10. artery/vein; 11. cell-rich zone; 12. cell-poor zone; 13. pulp chamber

The central region of the coronal and radicular pulp contains large nerve trunks and blood vessels.

This area is lined peripherally by a specialized odontogenic area which has four layers (from innermost to outermost):

1. Pulpal core, which is in the center of the pulp chamber, with many cells and an extensive vascular supply; except for its location, it is very similar to the cell-rich zone.
2. Cell-rich zone, which contains fibroblasts and undifferentiated mesenchymal cells.
3. Cell-free zone (zone of Weil, which is rich in both capillaries and nerve networks.
4. Odontoblastic layer, the outermost layer which contains odontoblasts and lies next to the predentin and mature dentin.

Cells found in the dental pulp include fibroblasts (the principal cell), odontoblasts, defence cells like histiocytes, macrophages, granulocytes, mast cells, and plasma cells. The nerve plexus of Raschkow is located central to the cell-rich zone.

=== The plexus of Raschkow ===
The plexus of Raschkow monitors painful sensations. By virtue of their peptide content, they also play important functions in inflammatory events and subsequent tissue repair. There are two types of nerve fibers that mediate the sensation of pain: A-Fibres conduct rapid and sharp pain sensations and belong to the myelinated group, whereas C-Fibres are involved in dull aching pain and are thinner and unmyelinated. The A-Fibres, mainly of the A-delta type, are preferentially located in the periphery of the pulp, where they are in close association with the odontoblasts and extend fibers to many but not all dentinal tubules. The C-Fibres typically terminate in the pulp tissue proper, either as free nerve endings or as branches around blood vessels. Sensory nerve fibers that originate from inferior and superior alveolar nerves innervate the odontoblastic layer of the pulp cavity. These nerves enter the tooth through the apical foramen as myelinated nerve bundles. They branch to form the subodontoblastic nerve plexus of Raschkow, which is separated from the odontoblasts by a cell-free zone of Weil. This plexus lies between the cell-free and cell-rich zones of the pulp.

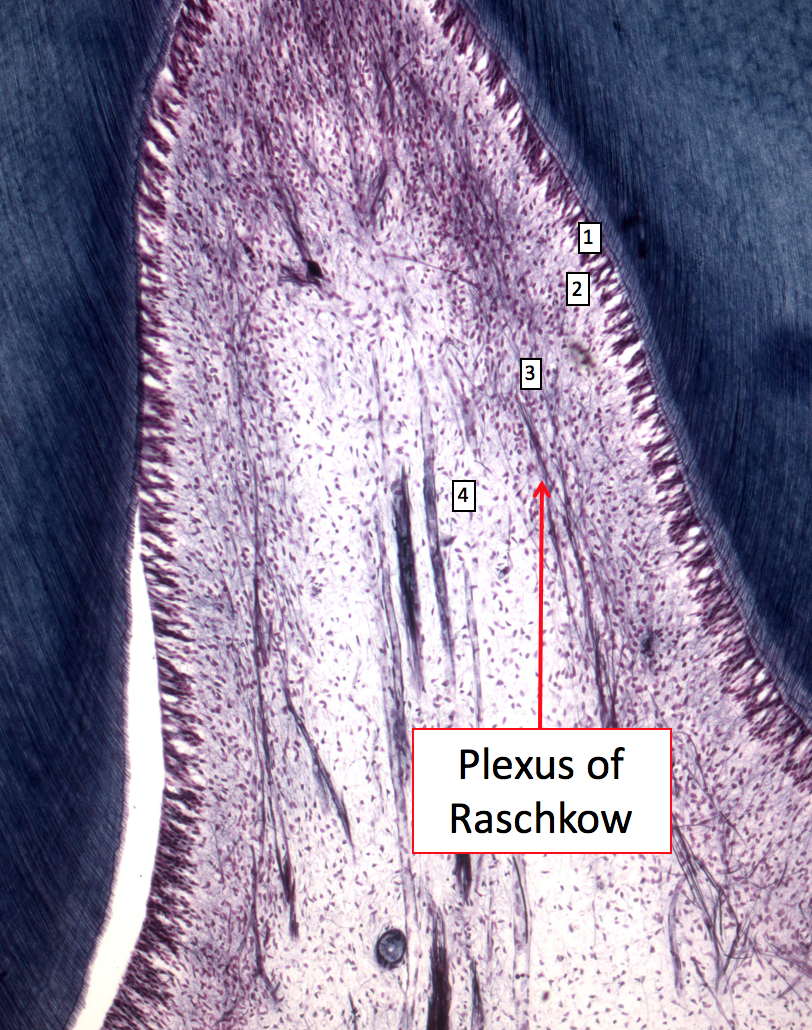
Plexus of Raschkow: 1. Odontoblast layer; 2. Cell-free zone of Weil; 3. Cell-rich zone; 4. Pulp core

=== Pulp innervation ===
As the dental pulp is a highly vascularised and innervated region of the tooth, it is the site of origin for most pain-related sensations. The dental pulp nerve is innervated by one of the trigeminal nerves, otherwise known as the fifth cranial nerve. The neurons enter the pulp cavity through the apical foramen and branch off to form the nerve plexus of Raschkow. Nerves from the plexus of Raschkow provide branches to form a marginal plexus around the odontoblasts, with some nerves penetrating the dentinal tubules.

The dental pulp is also innervated by the sympathetic division of the autonomic nervous system. These sympathetic axons project into the radicular pulp, where they form a plexus along the blood vessels. Their function is mainly related to blood vessel constriction within the dental pulp. A sharp fall in pulpal blood flow may be caused by stimulation of these nerves. There is no evidence for a parasympathetic pulpal innervation.

There are two main types of sensory nerve fibres in the pulp, each densely placed at different locations. The differing structural features of the two sensory nerve fibres also result in different types of sensory stimulation.

- Myelinated A-Fibres:
  - The A-Fibres present in the pulp can be further classified into 2 different types. A-Delta Fibres make up 90% of the A-Fibres, while the rest are A-Beta Fibres.
  - Have a relatively low-threshold sensory apparatus.
  - Mainly located at the pulp-dentine border at the top of the pulp, and more specifically concentrated in the pulp horn.
  - Have a relatively small diameter with a relatively slow conduction velocity. They are still faster than C-Fibres.
  - A-Fibres transmit signals to the brainstem and then to the contralateral thalamus.
  - Able to respond to stimuli through a shell of calcified tissue due to the stimulus-induced fluid flow in dentinal tubules. This is known as the hydrodynamic theory. Stimuli that displaces the fluid within the dentinal tubules will trigger the intradental myelinated A-Fibres, leading to the sharp pain sensation commonly associated with dentine hypersensitivity
- Unmyelinated C-Fibres:
  - They are mainly located at the core of the pulp and extend underneath the odontoblastic layer.
  - C-Fibres have higher pain thresholds, responsible for detecting inflammatory threats.
  - They are heavily influenced by modulating interneurons before they reach the thalamus. C-Fibre stimulation often results in a "slow pain", normally characterised as a dull and aching pain.

== Functions ==
The primary function of the dental pulp is to form dentin (by the odontoblasts).

Other functions include:

- Nutritive: the pulp keeps the organic components of the surrounding mineralized tissue supplied with moisture and nutrients;
- Protective/sensory: extremes in temperature, pressure, or trauma to the dentin or pulp are perceived as pain;
- Defensive/reparative: the formation of reparative or tertiary dentin (by the odontoblasts);
- Formative: cells of the pulp produce dentin which surrounds and protects the pulpal tissue.

== Pulp testing ==
The health of the dental pulp can be established by a variety of diagnostic aids which test either the blood supply to a tooth (Vitality Test) or the sensory response of the nerves within the root canal to specific stimuli (Sensitivity Test). Although less accurate, sensitivity tests, such as Electric Pulp Tests or Thermal Tests, are more routinely used in clinical practice than vitality testing, which requires specialised equipment.

A healthy tooth is expected to respond to sensitivity testing with a short, sharp burst of pain which subsides when the stimulus is removed. An exaggerated or prolonged response to sensitivity testing indicates that the tooth has some degree of symptomatic pulpitis. A tooth that does not respond at all to sensitivity testing may have become necrotic.

== Pulp diagnoses ==
=== Normal pulp ===
In a healthy tooth, enamel and dentin layers protect the pulp from infection.

=== Reversible pulpitis ===
Reversible pulpitis is a mild to moderate inflammation caused by any momentary irritation or stimulant whereby no pain is felt upon the stimulants' removal. The pulp swells when the protective layers of enamel and dentine are compromised. Unlike irreversible pulpitis, the pulp gives a regular response to sensibility tests and inflammation resolves with management of the cause. No significant radiographic changes are present in the periapical region. Further examination is required to ensure that the dental pulp has returned to its normal state.

==== Common causes ====
- Bacterial infection from caries
- Thermal shock
- Trauma
- Excessive dehydration of a cavity during restoration
- Irritation of exposed dentine
- Repetitive trauma caused by bruxism or jaw misalignment
- Fractured tooth exposing pulp

==== Symptoms ====
- Temporary post-restoration sensitivity
- Non-spontaneous and milder pain compared to irreversible pulpitis
- Short sharp pain caused by a stimulant

==== Differential diagnosis ====
- X-rays to determine extent of decay and inflammation
- Sensitivity tests to see if pain/discomfort is experienced when tooth is in contact with hot, cold or sweet stimuli
- Tooth tap test (lightweight, blunt instrument gently tapped onto affected tooth to determine extent of inflammation)
- Electric pulp test

==== Treatment ====
- Treatment should resolve reversible pulpitis; early treating may help prevent irreversible pulpitis
- Follow-up required to determine whether the reversible pulpitis has returned to a normal status

==== Prevention ====
- Regular check-ups
- When preparing cavities, dehydrate with sufficient alcohol/chloroform and apply sufficient varnish to protect the pulp

=== Irreversible pulpitis ===
Pulpitis is established when the pulp chamber is compromised by bacterial infection. Irreversible pulpitis is diagnosed when the pulp is inflamed and infected beyond healing. Removal of the aetiological agent does not permit healing, and a root canal is often indicated. Irreversible pulpitis follows reversible pulpitis absent early intervention. While the pulp is still vital and vascularised, it is not classified as 'dead pulp'.

Irreversible and reversible pulpitis are distinguished by the pain responses to thermal stimulation. If the condition is reversible, the pulp's pain response lasts a few seconds upon exposure to cold or hot. If the pain lingers from minutes to hours, the condition is classified as irreversible. This is a common presenting complaint that facilitates initial diagnosis.

Irreversible puplitis may be symptomatic or asymptomatic. Asymptomatic irreversible pulpitis results from transition of symptomatic irreversible pulpitis into an inactive/quiescent state. This is due to its aetiology; inflammatory exudate can be quickly removed, e.g. through a large carious cavity or previous trauma that caused painless pulp exposure. The build-up of pressure in a confined pulp space initiates pain reflexes. When this pressure is relieved, pain subsides.

As the names imply, these diseases are largely characterised by their symptoms: pain duration and location, and exacerbating and relieving factors. Inputs include clinical tests (cold ethyl chloride, EPT, hot-gutta percha, palpation), radiographic analysis (peri-apical and/or cone-beam computed tomography) and others. Thermal tests are subjective, and are therefore performed the compromised tooth and the adjacent and contralateral teeth, allowing the patient to compare them. Normal healthy teeth are used as a baseline for diagnoses.

Key characteristics of symptomatic irreversible pulpitis include:

- Spontaneous and unpredictable pain at any time, and specific causal factors cannot be identified
- Patient may complain of sharp lingering pains that last longer than 30 seconds, even after removal of stimulus
- Possible referred pain
- Pain may increase with changes of posture, e.g. from lying down to standing.
- Analgesics tend to be ineffective.
- No pain on percussion because the bacteria are not present in the peri-apical region.

Key characteristics of asymptomatic irreversible pulpitis include:

- No clinical symptoms.
- Pulp will respond to sensitivity tests as a healthy pulp would.

Treatments include root canal or tooth extraction. In endodontic therapy, removal of the inflamed pulp relieves the pain. The empty root canal system is then obturated with gutta-percha (rubber material that acts as a pressure/pain reliever).

=== Pulp necrosis ===
Pulp necrosis occurs when the pulp has died or is dying. Causes include untreated caries, trauma or bacterial infection. It is often subsequent to chronic pulpitis. Teeth with pulp necrosis undergo a root canal or extraction to prevent further spread of the infection, which may lead to an abscess.

==== Symptoms ====
Necrosis may be symptomatic or asymptomatic. Symptomatic necrosis involves lingering pain response to hot and cold stimuli, spontaneous pain that may cause a patient to awaken during sleep, difficulty eating and sensitivity to percussion. Asymptomatic necrosis is non-responsive to thermal stimuli or electric pulp tests, leaving the patient unaware of the pathology.

==== Diagnosis ====
Asymptomatic necrosis may go unnoticed by the patient and so a diagnosis may not be attempted. Diagnosis may involve X-rays and sensitivity testing with. hot or cold stimuli (using warm gutta-percha or ethyl chloride), or an electric pulp tester. Tooth vitality (blood supply) may be assessed using doppler flowmetry. Sequelae of a necrotic pulp include acute apical periodontitis, dental abscess, or radicular cyst and tooth discolouration.

==== Prognosis and treatment ====
Untreated necrotic pulp may result in further complications, such as infection, fever, swelling, abscesses and bone loss. Two treatment options are available for pulpal necrosis.

=== Pulp response to caries ===
Pulpal response to caries can be divided into two stages – pre- and post-infection. In caries-affected human teeth, odontoblast-like cells appear at the dentine-pulp interface along with specialized pulp immune cells to combat caries. Once they identify specific bacterial components, these cells activate innate and adaptive immunity.

In uninfected pulp, leukocytes can sample and respond to the environment, involving macrophages, dendritic cells (DCs), T cells and B cells. This sampling process is part of the normal immune response, as it triggers leukocytes from the circulatory system to adhere to endothelial cells lining blood vessels and then migrates to the site of infection for defence. Macrophages can phagocytose bacteria and activate T cells, triggering the adaptive immune response that occurs in association with DCs. In the pulp, DCs secrete a range of cytokines that influence immune responses, and are key regulators of the infection defence. A comparatively small number of B cells are present in healthy pulp tissue, and pulpitis and caries progression increase their numbers.

When bacteria get closer to the pulp but are still confined to primary or secondary dentine, acid demineralization of dentine occurs, producing tertiary dentine to help protect the pulp from further injury.

After a pulp exposure, pulp cells are recruited and differentiate into odontoblast-like cells, contributing to the formation of a dentine bridge, increasing dentin thickness. The odontoblast-like cell is a mineralized structure formed by a new population of pulp-derived cells that can be expressed as Toll-like receptors. They are responsible for the upregulation of innate immunity effectors, including antimicrobial agents and chemokines. One important antimicrobial agent produced by odontoblasts is beta-defensins (BDs). BDs kill microorganisms by forming micropores that destroy membrane integrity and cause leakage of the cell content. Another is nitric oxide (NO), a highly diffusible free radical that stimulates chemokine production to attract immune cells to the affected areas and neutralize bacterial by-products in pulp cells in vitro.

=== Pulp stones ===
Pulp stones are calcified masses that occur in the pulp, either in the apical or coronal portions. They are classified according to their structure or location. According to their location, pulp stones can be classed either as free (completely surrounded by pulp), embedded (surrounded by dentine tissue) or adherent (attached to pulp wall continuous with dentine, but not fully enclosed). Depending on the structure, they are either true (dentine lined by odontoblasts), false (formed from degenerating cells that mineralise) or diffuse (more irregular in shape to false stones). The aetiology of pulp stones is little understood. It has been recorded that pulpal calcifications can occur due to:

- Pulp degeneration
- Increasing age
- Orthodontic treatment
- Traumatic occlusion
- Dental caries

Pulp stones usually consist of circular layers of mineralised tissues. These layers are made up of blood clots, dead cells and collagen fibres. Occasionally, pulp stones appear surrounded by odontoblast-like cells that contain tubules.

Pulp stones can reach as high as 50% in surveyed samples. Pulp stones are estimated to typically range from 8–9%. Pulpal calcifications are more common in females and more frequent in maxillary teeth compared to mandibular teeth. The reason is uncertain. They are more common in molar teeth, especially first molars compared to second molars and premolars. A review suggested this was because the first molars are the first teeth to be located in the mandible (lower jaw) and have longer exposure to degenerative changes. They also have a larger blood supply.

In general, pulp stones do not require treatment. Depending on the stones' size and location, they may interfere with endodontic treatment and should be removed.

=== Complications ===
Pulp acts as a security and alarm system. Slight decay in tooth structure not extending to the dentin may not alarm the pulp, but as the dentin gets exposed, due either to dental caries or trauma, sensitivity starts. The dentinal tubules pass the stimulus to the pulp's odontoblastic layer, triggering the response. This mainly responds to cold. At this stage, simple restoration can be performed. As the decay progresses near the pulp, the response magnifies. Sensation to heat and cold increases. At this stage, indirect pulp capping may be advisable. At this stage it may be impossible to clinically diagnose the extent of decay. Carious dentin by dental decay progressing to the pulp may get fractured during mastication, traumatizing the pulp, resulting in pulpitis.

Pulpitis can be painful and may call for root canal therapy or endodontic therapy. Traumatized pulp starts an inflammatory response. The hard and closed surroundings builds pressure inside the pulp chamber, compressing the nerve fibres and eliciting pain. At this stage, the pulp starts to die, progressing to periapical abscess formation (chronic pulpitis).

Pulp horns recede with age. The pulp undergoes a decrease in intercellular substance, water, and cells as it fills with collagen fibers. This decrease in cells is evident in the reduced number of undifferentiated mesenchymal cells. The pulp becomes more fibrotic, reducing the regenerative capacity of the pulp due to the loss of these cells. The overall pulp cavity may become smaller by the addition of secondary or tertiary dentin and cause pulp recession. The lack of sensitivity associated with older teeth is due to receded pulp horns, pulp fibrosis, the addition of dentin, or all these changes. Restorative treatment can be performed without local anaesthesia on older dentitions.

== History ==
The Roman anatomist Galen commented on Hippocrates' work, classifying teeth as bones, noting their distinct characteristics compared to other bones. He was the first to discover nerves in teeth and identified seven cranial nerves in his research.

== See also ==
- Dental pulp stem cells
- Dental pulp test
