= Odontoblast =

Type of cell that produces dentin in teeth

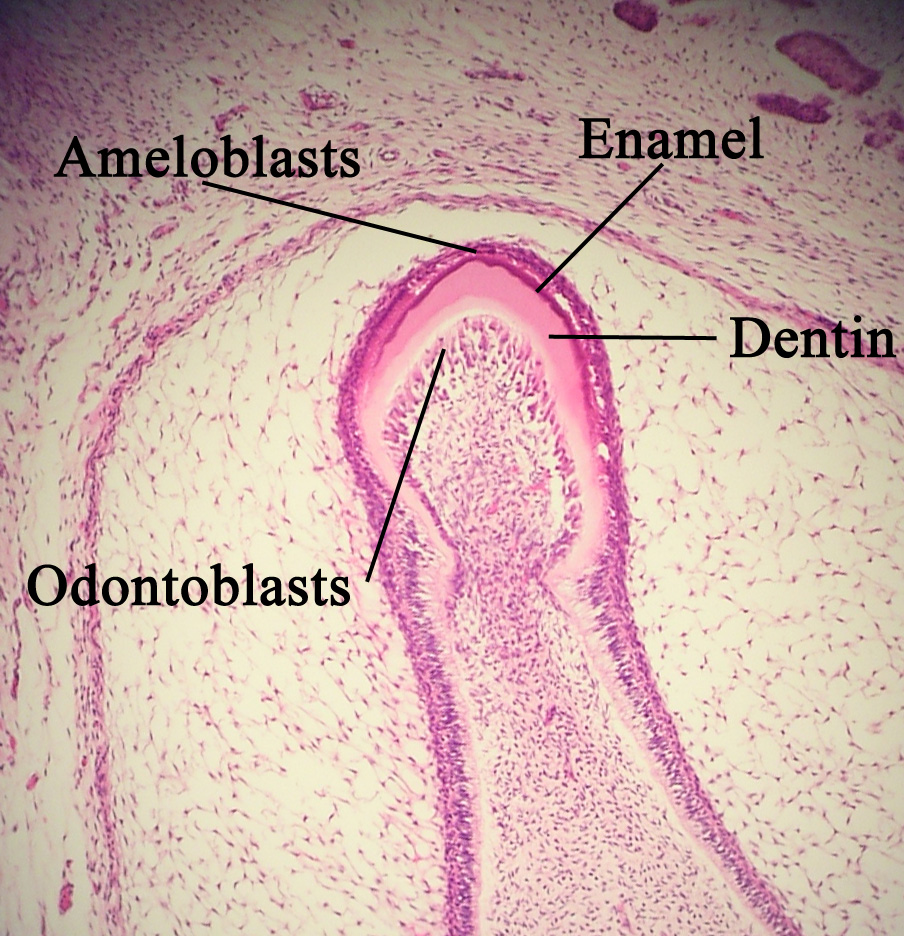
- A developing tooth with odontoblasts marked.

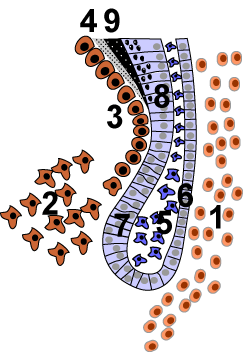
- The cervical loop area: (1) dental follicle cells, (2) dental mesenchyme, (3) Odontoblasts, (4) Dentin, (5) stellate reticulum, (6) outer enamel epithelium, (7)inner enamel epithelium, (8) ameloblasts, (9) enamel.

Details
- Precursor: Neural crest
- Location: Tooth

Identifiers
- Latin: odontoblastus
- MeSH: D009804
- FMA: 62999

In vertebrates, an odontoblast is a cell of neural crest origin that is part of the outer surface of the dental pulp, and whose biological function is dentinogenesis, which is the formation of dentin, the substance beneath the tooth enamel on the crown and the cementum on the root.

== Structure ==
Odontoblasts are large columnar cells, whose cell bodies are arranged along the interface between dentin and pulp, from the crown to the cervix to the root apex in a mature tooth. The cell is rich in endoplasmic reticulum and Golgi complex, especially during primary dentin formation, which allows it to have a high secretory capacity; it first forms the collagenous matrix to form predentin, then mineral levels to form the mature dentin. Odontoblasts form approximately 4 μm of predentin daily during tooth development.

During secretion after differentiation from the outer cells of the dental papilla, it is noted that it is polarized so its nucleus is aligned away from the newly formed dentin, with its Golgi complex and endoplasmic reticulum towards the dentin reflecting its unidirectional secretion. Thus, with the formation of primary dentin, the cell moves pulpally, away from the basement membrane (future dentinoenamel junction) at the interface between the inner enamel epithelium and dental papilla, leaving behind the odontoblastic process within the dentin. The odontoblastic cell body keeps its tapered structure with cytoskeletal fibres, mainly intermediate filaments. Unlike cartilage and bone, as well as cementum, the odontoblast's cell body does not become entrapped in the product; rather, one long, cytoplasmic attached extension remains behind in the formed dentin. The differentiation of the odontoblast is done by signaling molecules and growth factors in the cells of the inner enamel epithelium.

Like enamel, dentin is avascular. Nutrition for odontoblasts within the dentin comes through the dentinal tubules from tissue fluid that originally traveled from the blood vessels located in the adjacent pulp tissue. Within each dentinal tubule is a space of variable size containing dentinal fluid, an odontoblastic process, and possibly an afferent axon (see next discussion). The dentinal fluid in the tubule presumably also includes the tissue fluid surrounding the cell membrane of the odontoblast, which is continuous from the cell body in the pulp.

It has been shown that odontoblasts secrete the extracellular matrix protein reelin.

A pulpal A-delta (noxious, short sharp pain) nerve fibre is either wrapped around the base of this process, or travels a short way into the dentinal tubule with the odontoblast process (max ~0.1 mm) This process lies in the dentinal tubule. In primates, enamel spindles were observed where the odontoblast process reaches until the border between dentin and enamel. With the discovery of TRPC5 as cold transducer the odontoblast transduction theory has become a likely explanation of dentinal hypersensivity

The contribution of TRPC5 channels to the sensory function in odontoblasts is still controversial

It has been shown that odontoblast-neuron signal communication via Piezo1/TRPA1 channels and pannexin-1 in odontoblasts and P2X3 receptors in A-delta neuron is involved in the generation of dentinal sensitivity/hypersensitivity. Oodontoblasts are necessary for sensory transduction to generate dentinal sensitivity as mechanosensory receptor cells.

=== Development ===
Odontoblasts first appear at sites of tooth development at 17–18 weeks in utero and remain present until death unless killed by bacterial or chemical attack, or indirectly through other means such as heat or trauma (e.g. during dental procedures). Odontoblasts were originally the outer cells of the dental papilla. Thus, dentin and pulp tissue have similar embryological backgrounds, because both are originally derived from the dental papilla of the tooth germ.

== Function ==
1. To aid in the secretion of intertubular and peritubular dentin (the dentin surrounding odontoblastic process) that forms the dentinal tubule, which further organizes and strengthens the dentin as a whole
2. General maintenance of both the dentinal tubule and dentinal fluid (ion/protein content etc.)
3. To secrete sclerotic dentin upon carious attack to block off dentinal tubules, slowing the progress of the attack (air space above blockage is known as a dead tract)
4. To channel signals of attack to the odontoblastic cell body, thus initiating secretion of reactionary dentin
5. To act as a cellular component of the dental temperature sensing system either by sensing temperature changes directly or by detecting hydrokinetic forces of fluid movement in the tubules or a combination of both.

The odontoblasts secrete dentin throughout life, unlike enamel, which is considered secondary dentin once root formation is complete, which may be an attempt to compensate for natural wear of the enamel. This is because of the retention of the odontoblasts within the tooth, along the outer pulpal wall.

Odontoblasts also secrete tertiary dentin when irritated. Tertiary dentin secreted by odontoblasts is often due to chemical attack, either by chemicals diffusing through the dentin and insulting the odontoblasts, or by diffusion of toxic bacterial metabolites down the dentinal tubules in the instance of a carious attack with dental decay. This tertiary dentin is called reactionary dentin. This is an attempt to slow down the progress of the caries so that it does not reach the pulp.

In the case of an infection breaching the dentin to or very near the pulp, or in the instance of odontoblast death due to other attack (e.g. chemical or physical), undifferentiated mesenchymal cells can differentiate into odontoblast-like cells which then secrete another type, reparative dentin, underneath the site of attack. This is not only to slow the progress of the attack, but also prevents the diffusion of bacteria and their metabolites into the pulp, reducing the probability of partial pulp necrosis.

The distinction of the two kinds of tertiary dentin is important, because they are secreted by different cells for different reasons. Reactionary dentin is secreted at varying speeds, dependent on the speed of progression of caries in the outer dentin surface. Histologically, it is easily distinguishable by its disordered tube structure, the location of the secretion (it protrudes into the pulpal cavity) and its slightly lower degree of mineralization than normal. The tooth is often able to be saved by a simple restoration. In contrast, reparative dentin is secreted when the tooth has a poor prognosis.

== Other animals ==
Teeth in the molluscan radula are also produced by cells termed "odontoblasts".

== See also ==
- Tooth development
- Ameloblast
- Cementoblast
- List of human cell types derived from the germ layers
- List of distinct cell types in the adult human body
