= Dentin =

Calcified tissue of the body; one of the four major components of teeth

- Parts of a tooth, including dentin

Details

Identifiers
- Latin: dentinum
- MeSH: D003804
- TA98: A05.1.03.055
- TA2: 937
- FMA: 55628

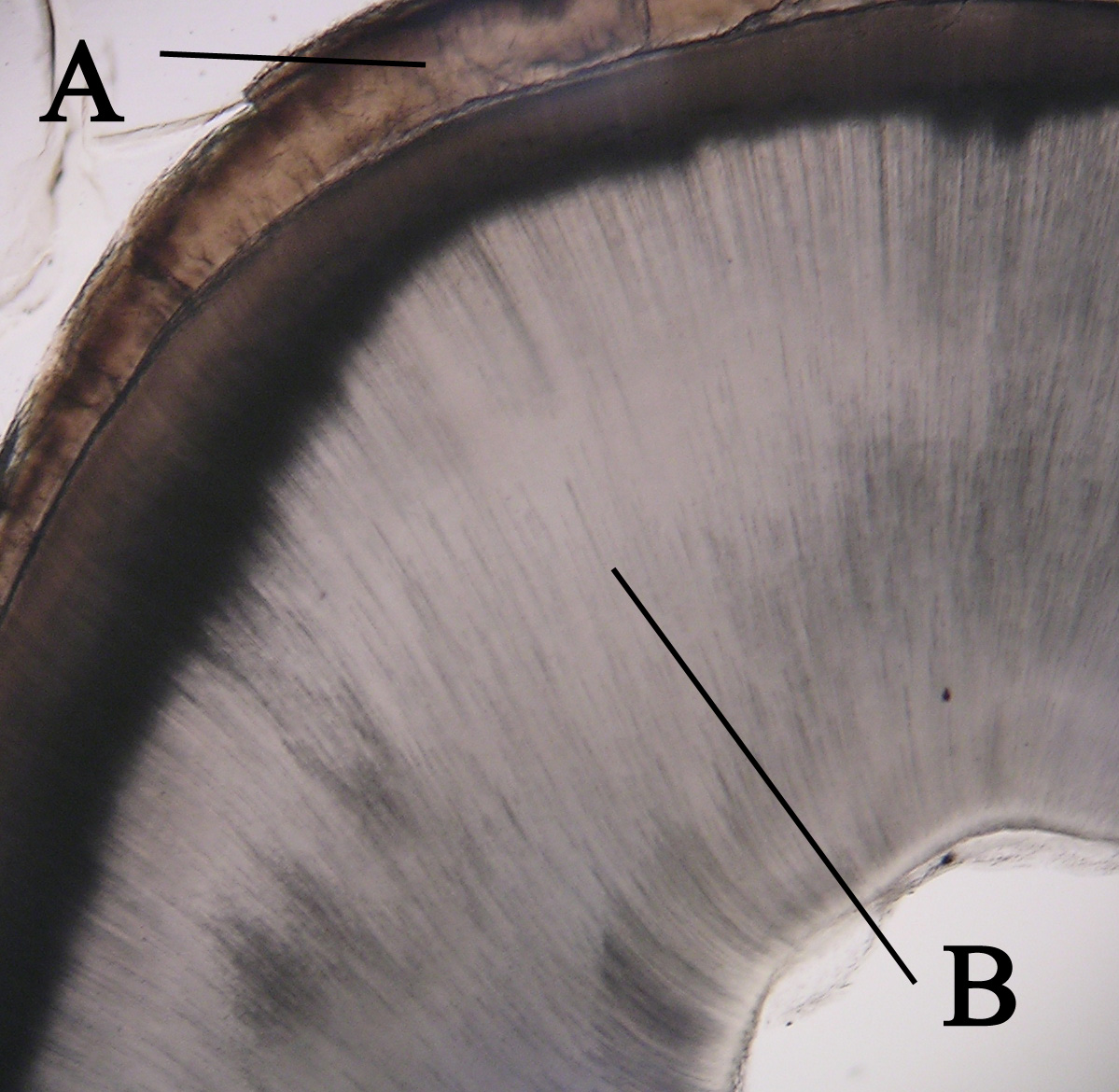
Cross-section of a tooth. B is dentin.

Dentin (/ˈdɛntɪn/ DEN-tin) (American English) or dentine (/ˈdɛnˌtiːn/ DEN-teen or /ˌdɛnˈtiːn/ DEN-TEEN) (British English) (Latin: substantia eburnea) is a calcified tissue of the body and, along with enamel, cementum, and pulp, is one of the four major components of teeth. It is usually covered by enamel on the crown and cementum on the root and surrounds the entire pulp. By volume, 45% of dentin consists of the mineral hydroxyapatite, 33% is organic material, and 22% is water. Yellow in appearance, it greatly affects the color of a tooth due to the translucency of enamel. Dentin, which is less mineralized and less brittle than enamel, is necessary for the support of enamel. Dentin rates approximately 3 on the Mohs scale of mineral hardness. There are two main characteristics which distinguish dentin from enamel: firstly, dentin forms throughout life; secondly, dentin is sensitive and can become hypersensitive to changes in temperature due to the sensory function of odontoblasts, especially when enamel recedes and dentin channels become exposed.

== Development ==
Prior to enamel formation, dentin formation begins through a process known as dentinogenesis, and this process continues throughout a person's life even after the tooth has fully developed. Events such as tooth decay and tooth wear can also initiate dentin formation.

Dentinogenesis is initiated by the odontoblasts of the pulp. Odontoblasts are specialised cells that lay down an organic matrix known as pre-dentin. This predentin is subsequently mineralized into dentin. Mineralization of predentin begins at the dentinoenamel junction during tooth development and progresses towards the pulp of the tooth. After growth of predentin and maturation into dentin, the cell bodies of the odontoblasts remain in the pulp, along its outer wall, and project into tiny tubules in the dentin.

Predentin is composed of 90% type I collagen and 10% non-collagenous proteins (including phosphoproteins, proteoglycans, growth factors, phosphatases such as alkaline phosphatase, and matrix metalloproteinases (MMPs)), and this composition is significantly altered when it is mineralized into dentin. See the Structure section for information about the composition of dentin.

== Structure ==
Unlike enamel, dentin may be demineralized and stained for histological study. Dentin consists of microscopic channels, called dentinal tubules, which radiate outward through the dentin from the pulp to the exterior cementum or enamel border. The dentinal tubules extend from the dentinoenamel junction (DEJ) in the crown area, or dentinocemental junction (DCJ) in the root area, to the outer wall of the pulp. From the outer surface of the dentin to the area nearest the pulp, these tubules follow an S-shaped path. The diameter and density of the tubules are greatest near the pulp. Tapering from the inner to the outermost surface, they have a diameter of 2.5 μm near the pulp, 1.2 μm in the middle of the dentin, and 0.9 μm at the dentinoenamel junction. Their density is 59,000 to 76,000 per square millimeter near the pulp, whereas the density is only half as much near the enamel. Within the tubules, there is an odontoblast process, which is an extension of an odontoblast, and dentinal fluid, which contains a mixture of albumin, transferrin, tenascin and proteoglycans. In addition, there are branching canalicular systems that connect to each other. These branches have been categorized by size, with major being 500–1000 nm in diameter, fine being 300–700 nm, and micro being less than 300 nm. The major branches are the terminal ends of the tubules. About every 1-2 μm, there are fine branches diverging from dentinal tubules at 45 degree angles. The microtubules diverge at 90 degree angles. The dentinal tubules contain the cytoplasmic extensions of odontoblasts that once formed the dentin and maintain it. The cell bodies of the odontoblasts are aligned along the inner aspect of dentin against a layer of predentin where they also form the peripheral boundary of the dental pulp Because of dentinal tubules, dentin has a degree of permeability, which can increase the sensation of pain and the rate of tooth decay. The strongest held theory of dentinal hypersensitivity suggests that it is due to changes in the dentinal fluid associated with the processes, possibly a type of hydrodynamic mechanism.

Dentin is a bone-like matrix that is porous and yellow-hued material. It is made up, by weight, of 70–72% inorganic materials (mainly hydroxylapatite and some non-crystalline amorphous calcium phosphate), 20% organic materials (90% of which is collagen type 1 and the remaining 10% ground substance, which includes dentin-specific proteins), and 8–10% water (which is adsorbed on the surface of the minerals or between the crystals). Because it is less mineralized than enamel, it decays more rapidly and is subject to severe cavities if not properly treated, but due to its elastic properties, it is good support for enamel. Its flexibility prevents the brittle enamel fracturing during tooth preparation.

In areas where both primary and secondary mineralization have occurred with complete crystalline fusion, these appear as lighter rounded areas on a stained section of dentin and are considered globular dentin. In contrast, the darker arc-like areas in a stained section of dentin are considered interglobular dentin. In these areas, only primary mineralization has occurred within the predentin, and the globules of dentin do not fuse completely. Thus, interglobular dentin is slightly less mineralized than globular dentin. Interglobular dentin is especially evident in coronal dentin, near the dentinoenamel junction (DEJ), and in certain dental anomalies, such as in dentinogenesis imperfecta.

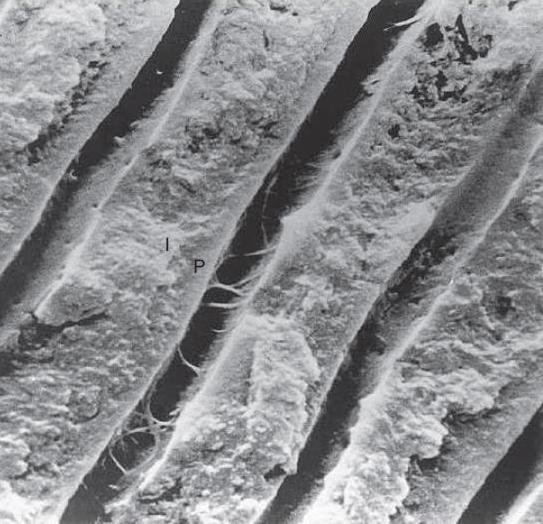
Dentinal tubules- Microscopic image

=== Regional variations in dentin structure and composition ===
The different regions in dentin can be recognized due to their structural differences. The outermost layer, known as the mantle dentin layer, is found in the crown of the tooth. It can be identified by the presence of various characteristics, including collagen fibres found perpendicular to the enamel-dentin junction and it is slightly less mineralized (by approximately 5%, compared to the enamel. The dentin undergoes mineralization in the presence of matrix vesicles ("hydroxyapatite-containing, membrane-enclosed vesicles secreted by odontoblasts, osteoblasts, and some chondrocytes; believed to serve as nucleation centers for the mineralization process in dentin, bone, and calcified cartilage.") The dentinal tubules in this region branch profusely.

In the root of the tooth there are two morphologically distinguishable outer layers: the hyaline layer on the periphery of dentin and Tomes granular layer beneath this. The granular layer has a dark, granular appearance which occurs due to the branching and looping back of dentinal tubules in this region. This appearance, specific to root dentin, is possibly due to differences in the rates of formation of coronal and root dentin. The hyaline layer, which has an obscure origin, is a clear layer, unlike the granular layer, with a width of up to 20μm. It can have clinical significance during periodontal regeneration.

Circumpulpal dentin forms the majority of the dentin and is generally constant in structure. Peripherally, mineralization can be seen to be incomplete, whereas centrally the mineralizing front shows ongoing mineralizing.

The innermost layer of dentin is known as predentin, and is the initial dentin matrix that is laid down prior to mineralization. It can be distinguished by its pale color when stained with haematoxylin and eosin. The presence of odontoblastic processes here allows the secretion of matrix components. Predentin can be 10-40μm in width, depending on its rate of deposition.

=== Microstructure and crack propagation ===
During the dentinogenesis process, the odontoblast cells retreat from the DEJ to the outer lining of the pulp, leaving behind microtubules filled with cytoplasmic extensions and depositing intertubular dentin (ITD) in its place. ITD comprises the bulk of the dentin and, similarly to bone, is a matrix composite of tablet-shaped hydroxyapatite nanoparticles wrapped around collagen fibers. The mineralized collagen fibers are arranged in layers oriented perpendicular to the direction of the dentin microtubules which are lined with peritubular dentin (PTD), a 1-2 μm thick layer of hydroxyapatite tablets with no preferred orientation and lacks any supporting collagen fibers.

The hydroxyapatite tablets within the ITD were found to be compressed along the crystallographic c-axis due to tight interaction between the tablets and the collagen fiber. Tablets aligned parallel with the collagen fibers experience a significant increase in compressive stress of around 90 MPa and, for crack formation to occur, tensile stresses must first overcome this residual compressive stress. Since typical mastication stresses do not exceed 40 MPa, the ITD prevents cracks from forming during normal daily use and helps deflect cracks perpendicular to the dentin tubule and away from the pulp.

Inelastic deformation of dentin primarily happens through microcracking. Crack propagation within dentin travels preferentially along the interfaces of the ITD layers. Since the PTD, the hydroxyapatite tablets are not preferentially orientated; they are under less compressive residual stress, causing the microtubules to act as crack initiation sites. This manifests as cross-hatched shear microcracks forming at the microtubules in compression and as ring-shaped microcracks in tension. The tip of a larger crack creates a stress concentration that helps initiate microcracks around the microtubules ahead of it, consuming energy and resisting further damage. The imperfect linking of the microcrack to a larger crack also induces 'uncracked ligaments', which help arrest the larger crack. In comparison, enamel does not display the same fracture resistance, and fractures traveling across the DEJ are usually stopped within ~10 μm. The combination of the residual stress and the perpendicular orientation of the ITD mineralized collagen fibers significantly increases the fracture toughness and fatigue endurance limit along the microtubule direction.

== Types ==
Dentin is classified into three types: primary, secondary, and tertiary. Secondary dentin is a layer of dentin formed after the tooth's root has fully formed. Tertiary dentin develops as a result of a stimulus, such as a carious attack or wear.

=== Primary dentin ===
Primary dentin, the most prominent dentin in the tooth, lies between the enamel and the pulp chamber (near dentinoenamel junction). The outer layer closest to enamel is known as mantle dentin. This layer is unique to the rest of primary dentin. Mantle dentin is formed by newly differentiated odontoblasts and forms a layer consistently 15-20 micrometers (μm) wide. Unlike primary dentin, mantle dentin lacks phosphorylation, has loosely packed collagen fibrils and is less mineralized. Below it lies the circumpulpal dentin, more mineralized dentin which makes up most of the dentin layer and is secreted after the mantle dentin by the odontoblasts. Circumpulpal dentin is formed before the root formation is completed.

Newly secreted dentin is unmineralized and is called predentin. It is easily identified in hematoxylin and eosin stained sections since it stains less intensely than dentin. It is usually 10-47μm and lines the innermost region of the dentin. It is unmineralized and consists of collagen, glycoproteins, and proteoglycans. It is similar to osteoid in bone and is thickest when dentinogenesis is occurring.

=== Secondary dentin ===
Secondary dentin is formed after root formation is complete, normally after the tooth has erupted and is functional. It grows much more slowly than primary dentin but maintains its incremental aspect of growth. It has a similar structure to primary dentin, although its deposition is not always even around the pulp chamber. It appears greater in amounts on the roof and floor of the coronal pulp chamber, where it protects the pulp from exposure in older teeth. The secondary dentin formed is not in response to any external stimuli, and it appears very much similar to the primary dentin. It is the growth of this dentin that causes a decrease in the size of the pulp chamber with age. This is clinically known as pulp recession; cavity preparation in young patients, therefore, carries a greater risk of exposing the pulp. If this occurs, the pulp can be treated by different therapies such as direct pulp capping. Previously it was thought that pulp capping was most successful if followed by a stainless steel crown, however this procedure is usually unnecessary in children. It requires the unnecessary removal of enamel which is key to the life of the tooth. Adhesive dentistry allows for conservative restoration techniques that minimize the loss of tooth structure and should be used. In order to maintain space in the primary dentition, attempts are made not to extract a pulpal exposure.

=== Tertiary dentin (including reparative dentin and reactionary dentin) – pathologic ===
Tertiary dentin is dentin formed as a reaction to external stimulation such as cavities and wear. It is of two types, either reactionary, where dentin is formed from a pre-existing odontoblast, or reparative, where newly differentiated odontoblast-like cells are formed due to the death of the original odontoblasts, from a pulpal progenitor cell. Tertiary dentin is only formed by an odontoblast directly affected by a stimulus; therefore, the architecture and structure depend on the intensity and duration of the stimulus, e.g., if the stimulus is a carious lesion, there is extensive destruction of dentin and damage to the pulp, due to the differentiation of bacterial metabolites and toxins. Thus, tertiary dentin is deposited rapidly, with a sparse and irregular tubular pattern and some cellular inclusions; in this case, it is referred to as "osteodentin". Osteodentin is seen in Vit.A deficiency during development. However, if the stimulus is less active, it is laid down less rapidly with a more regular tubular pattern and hardly any cellular inclusions. The speed at which tertiary dentin forms also varies substantially among primate species.

== Defect and conditions ==
=== Dentinal sclerosis ===
Dentinal sclerosis or transparent dentin sclerosis of primary dentin is a change in the structure of teeth characterized by calcification of dentinal tubules. It can occur as a result of injury to dentin by caries or abrasion, or as part of the normal aging process.

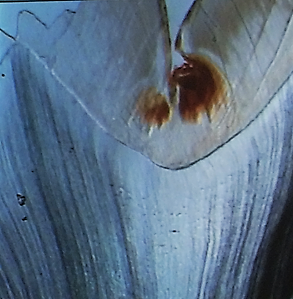
Dentinal sclerosis

== Animal dentin ==
Elephant ivory is solid dentin. The structure of the dentinal tubules contributes to both its porosity and its elasticity. Elephant tusks are formed with a thin cap of enamel, which soon wears away, leaving the dentin exposed. Exposed dentin in humans causes the symptom of sensitive teeth. Dentin is best known for its occurrence in teeth, but in early vertebrates, it was an important part of the dermal skeleton that covered most of the body, and it persists today in a few taxa such as the coelacanth.

Because dentin is less mineralized than enamel, it wears away more quickly than enamel. Some mammalian teeth exploit this phenomenon, especially herbivores such as horses, deer or elephants. In many herbivores, the occlusal (biting) surface of the tooth is composed of alternating areas of dentin and enamel. Differential wearing causes sharp ridges of enamel to be formed on the surface of the tooth (typically a molar), and to remain during the working life of the tooth. Herbivores grind their molars together as they chew (masticate), and the ridges help to shred tough plant material.

In xenarthrans, enamel is generally absent, with the tooth instead consisting of alternating orthodentine and vasodentine.

A material similar to dentin forms the hard material that makes up dermal denticles in sharks and other cartilaginous fish.

== See also ==
- Dentinogenesis
- Dentinogenesis imperfecta
- Odontoblast
- Tooth development
