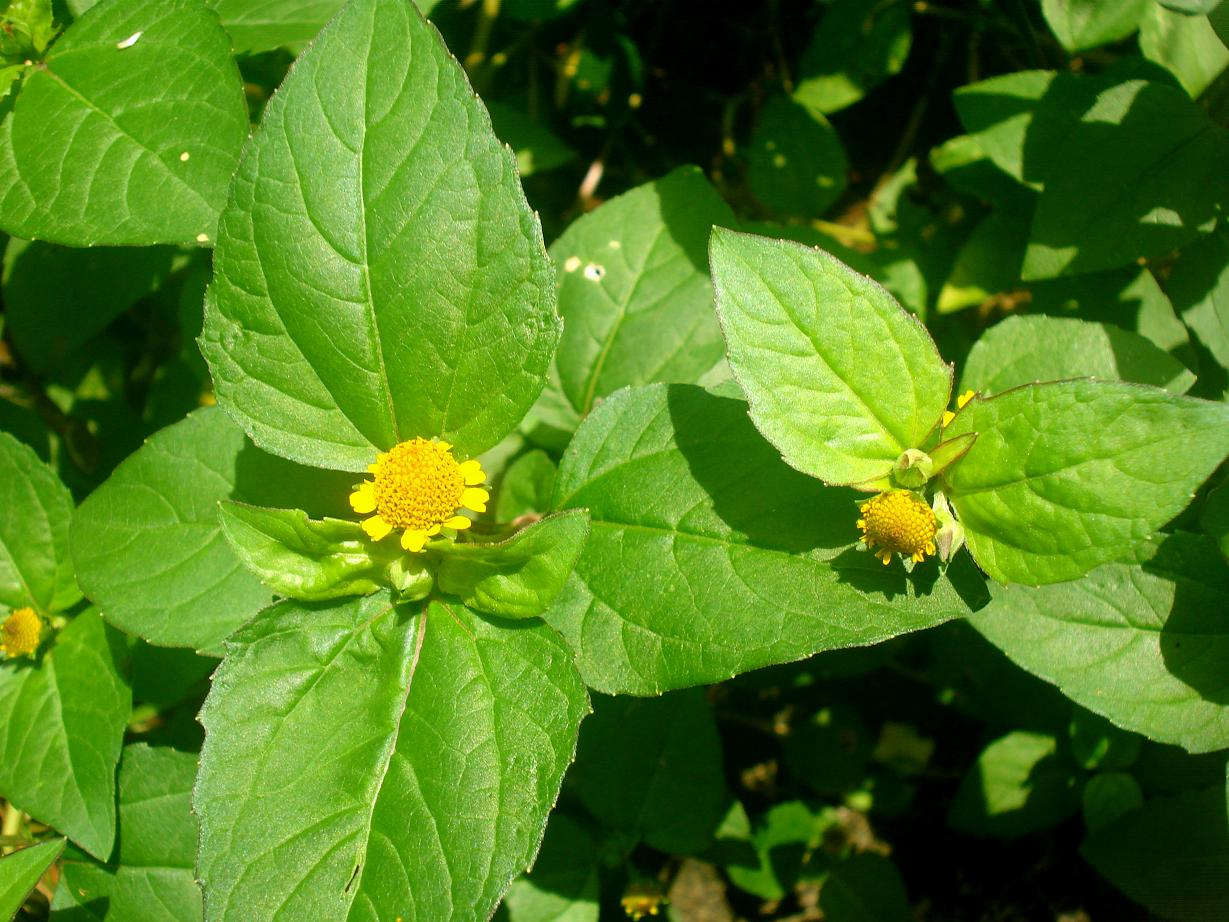
- Acmella ciliata

Scientific classification
- Kingdom: Plantae
- Clade: Embryophytes
- Clade: Tracheophytes
- Clade: Angiosperms
- Clade: Eudicots
- Clade: Asterids
- Order: Asterales
- Family: Asteraceae
- Subfamily: Asteroideae
- Tribe: Heliantheae
- Subtribe: Spilanthinae
- Genus: Acmella; Rich. ex Pers.

Type species
- Acmella repens (Walter) Rich.

Synonyms
- Spilanthes section Acmella (Pers.) DC.; Athronia Neck

= Acmella =

Genus of flowering plants

Acmella is a genus of plants in the family Asteraceae, described as a genus in 1807. It is native to the Americas and has been introduced to Asia, Africa, the Pacific islands, and Australia.

One familiar species is Acmella oleracea, which has been widely cultivated for centuries. It is used for food and medicine, and as an insecticide and an ornamental plant. Its common use as an herbal remedy for toothache and oral infections earned it the nickname toothache plant.

These are annual or perennial herbs with branching stems usually reaching 10 to 20 centimeters in length, growing prostrate or erect. The oppositely arranged leaves are smooth-edged or toothed, and usually have rough or soft hairs. The flower heads are usually solitary at the tips of the stem branches, or occasionally borne in inflorescences. There are several to many disc florets with bell-shaped throats and 4 or 5 triangular lobes, usually yellow, or sometimes orange. Some species lack ray florets, but some have 5 to 20 or more, usually in yellow or orange, but occasionally white or purple. The disc florets are bisexual, but any ray florets are pistillate.

== Species ==
Accepted species

- Acmella alba (L'Hér.) R.K.Jansen
- Acmella alpestris (Griseb.) R.K.Jansen
- Acmella bellidioides (Sm.) R.K.Jansen
- Acmella brachyglossa Cass.
- Acmella calva (DC.) R.K.Jansen
- Acmella caulirhiza Delile
- Acmella ciliata (Kunth) Cass.
- Acmella darwinii (D.M.Porter) R.K.Jansen
- Acmella decumbens (Sm.) R.K.Jansen
- Acmella filipes (Greenm.) R.K.Jansen
- Acmella glaberrima (Hassl.) R.K.Jansen
- Acmella grandiflora (Turcz.) R.K.Jansen
- Acmella grisea (Chodat) R.K.Jansen
- Acmella iodiscaea (A.H.Moore) R.K.Jansen
- Acmella leptophylla (DC.) R.K.Jansen
- Acmella leucantha (Kunth) R.K.Jansen
- Acmella lundellii R.K.Jansen
- Acmella oleracea (L.) R.K.Jansen
- Acmella oppositifolia (Lam.) R.K.Jansen
- Acmella paniculata (Wall. ex DC.) R.K.Jansen
- Acmella papposa (Hemsl.) R.K.Jansen
- Acmella pilosa R.K.Jansen
- Acmella poliolepidica (A.H.Moore) R.K.Jansen
- Acmella psilocarpa R.K.Jansen
- Acmella pusilla (Hook. & Arn.) R.K.Jansen
- Acmella radicans (Jacq.) R.K.Jansen
- Acmella ramosa (Hemsl.) R.K.Jansen
- Acmella repens (Walter) Rich. ex Pers.
- Acmella serratifolia R.K.Jansen
- Acmella sodiroi (Hieron.) R.K.Jansen
- Acmella uliginosa (Sw.) Cass.
