= Buzz buttons =

Buzz buttons may refer to:

- Acmella alba
- Acmella oleracea
