= Toothache plant =

Toothache plant may refer to:

- Acmella alba
- Acmella oleracea
