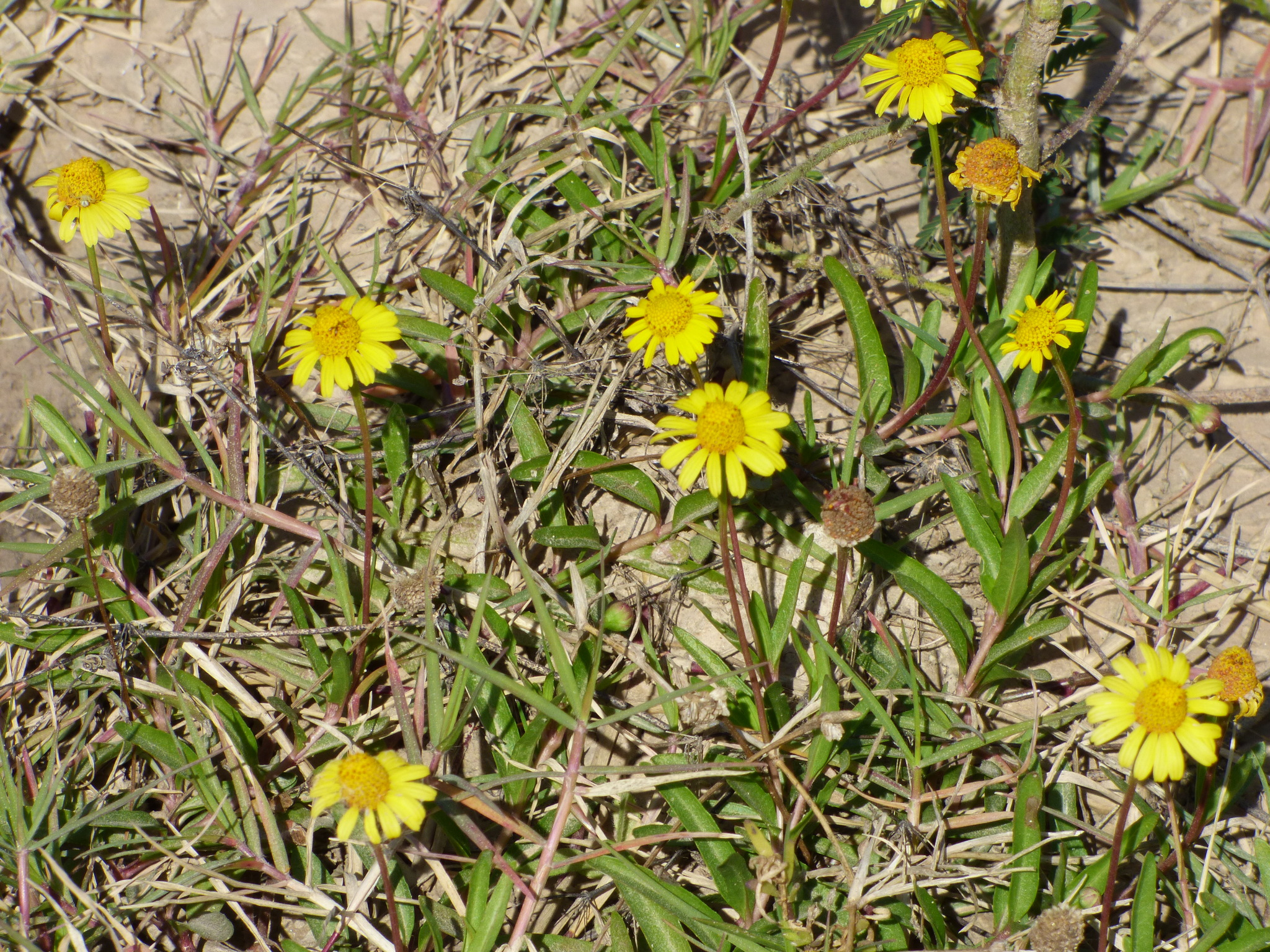

Scientific classification
- Kingdom: Plantae
- Clade: Tracheophytes
- Clade: Angiosperms
- Clade: Eudicots
- Clade: Asterids
- Order: Asterales
- Family: Asteraceae
- Genus: Acmella
- Species: A. pusilla

Binomial name
- Acmella pusilla (Hook. & Arn.) R.K.Jansen

Synonyms
- Spilanthes pusilla Hook. & Arn.

= Acmella pusilla =

Species of flowering plant

Acmella pusilla, the dwarf spotflower, is a species of flowering herb in the family Asteraceae. The plant is native to South America (Brazil, Argentina, Paraguay, Uruguay, etc.) and is naturalized in the southeastern United States (Florida, Georgia, North and South Carolina).
