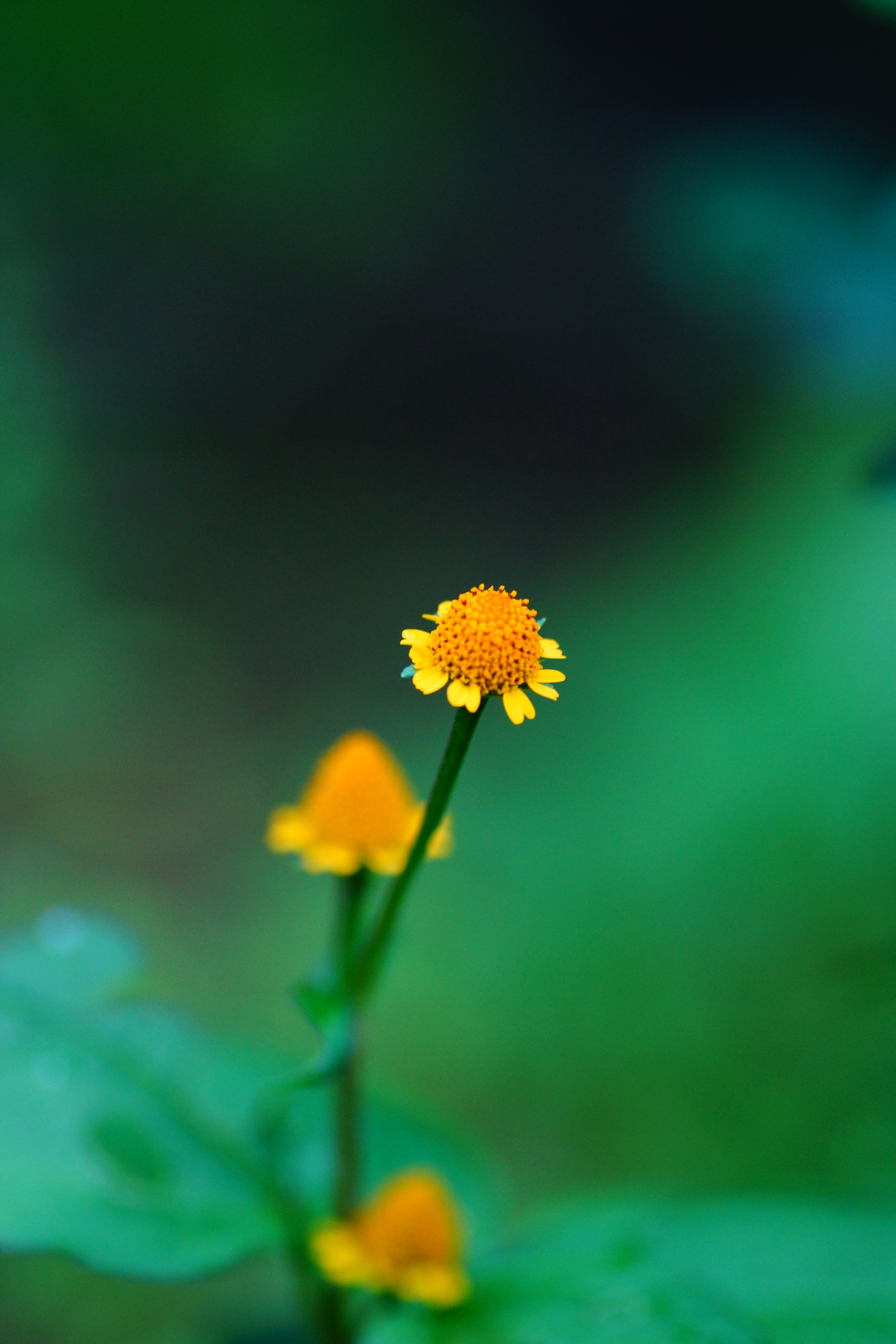

Conservation status
- Least Concern (IUCN 3.1)

Scientific classification
- Kingdom: Plantae
- Clade: Tracheophytes
- Clade: Angiosperms
- Clade: Eudicots
- Clade: Asterids
- Order: Asterales
- Family: Asteraceae
- Tribe: Heliantheae
- Genus: Acmella
- Species: A. uliginosa

Binomial name
- Acmella uliginosa (Sw.) Cass.

Synonyms
- Calea savannarum Standl. & Steyerm.; Spilanthes lundii DC.; Spilanthes uliginosa Sw.

= Acmella uliginosa =

Species of flowering plant

Acmella uliginosa, the marsh para cress, is a species of flowering herb in the family Asteraceae. The plant is native to South America (Brazil, Bolivia, Venezuela, etc.) and is naturalized in parts of Asia (China, Philippines, India, etc.) and Africa.
