= Open contact =

Space between teeth prone to food debris

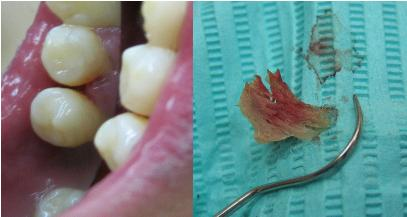
An open contact of approximately 1.5 mm shown between two posterior teeth. The shred of meat, at right, was recovered from the open contact more than 8 hours after the patient had last eaten meat, even though the patient claimed to have brushed his teeth twice since eating the meat the night before, thus exhibiting the importance of maintaining cleanliness of open contacts with an oral hygiene protocol incorporating the use of dental floss.

An open contact is a term used in dentistry to describe the space between adjacent teeth when the teeth are neither touching nor a sufficient distance from each other to potentially allow the space to naturally remain free of debris.

Open contacts can exist naturally, such as when teeth erupt into a nonideal occlusion or when they shift as a result of tooth loss. They are also frequently produced as a result of inadequately contoured dental restorations.

An open contact may lead to a phenomenon termed food packing/food impaction, which can be a cause of pain.
