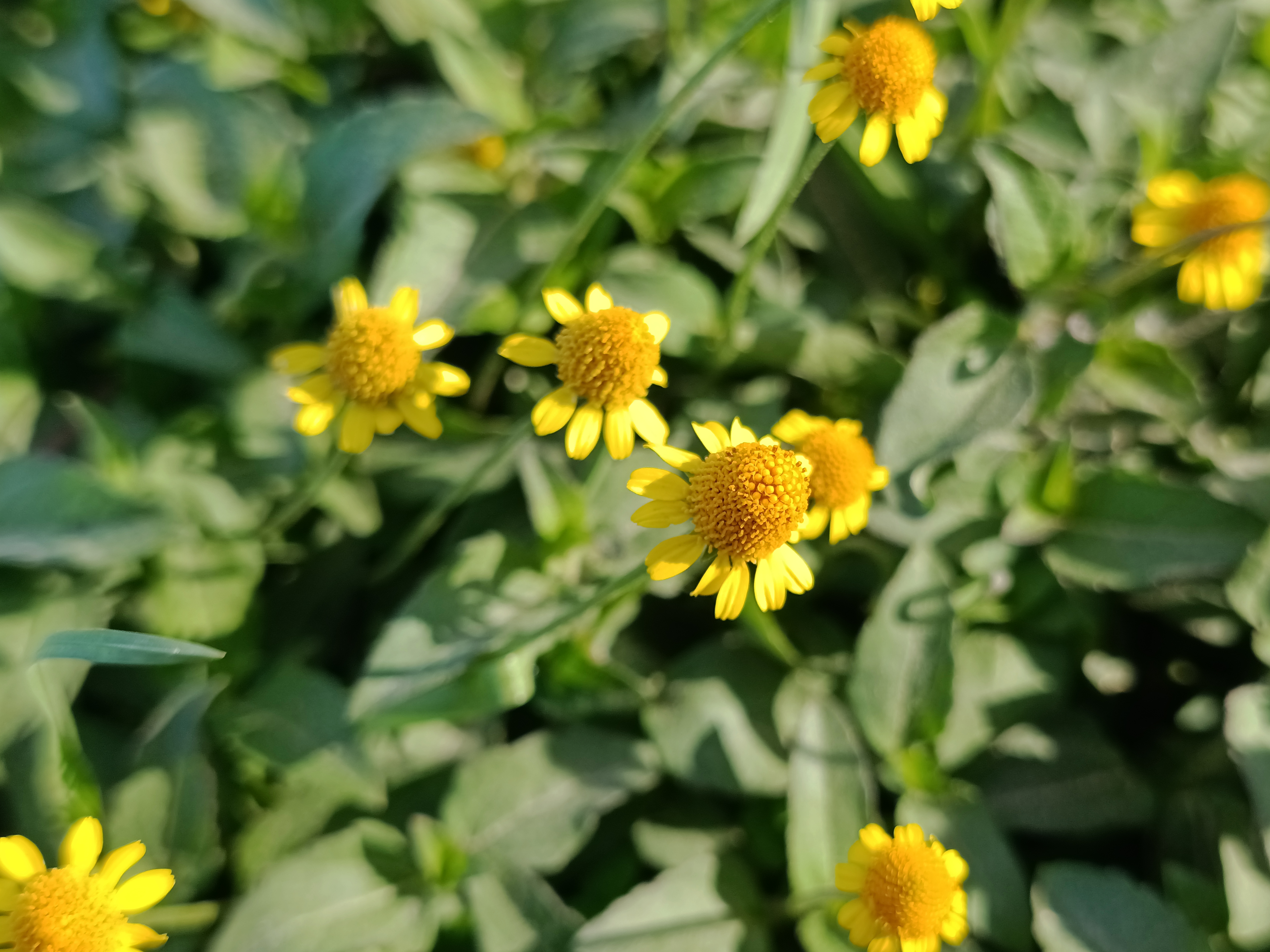

Conservation status
- Secure (NatureServe)

Scientific classification
- Kingdom: Plantae
- Clade: Tracheophytes
- Clade: Angiosperms
- Clade: Eudicots
- Clade: Asterids
- Order: Asterales
- Family: Asteraceae
- Tribe: Heliantheae
- Genus: Acmella
- Species: A. repens

Binomial name
- Acmella repens (Walter) Rich.

Synonyms
- Synonymy: Anthemis repens Walter; Acmella nuttaliana Raf.; Ceratocephalus beccabunga (DC.) Kuntze; Ceratocephalus diffusus (Poepp.) Kuntze; Ceratocephalus repens (Walter) Kuntze; Ceratocephalus subhirsutus (DC.) Kuntze; Spilanthes beccabunga DC.; Spilanthes diffusa Poepp. & Endl.; Spilanthes nuttallii Torr. & A.Gray; Spilanthes repens (Walter) Michx.

= Acmella repens =

Species of flowering plant

Acmella repens is a North American species of flowering plants in the family Asteraceae. The plant is native to the southeastern and south-central United States, primarily in the coastal plain from Texas to North Carolina and in the lower Mississippi Valley from Missouri to Louisiana. There are additional populations in Coahuila in northeastern Mexico.
