= Acmella leucantha =

Conservation status
- Vulnerable (IUCN 3.1)

Scientific classification
- Kingdom: Plantae
- Clade: Tracheophytes
- Clade: Angiosperms
- Clade: Eudicots
- Clade: Asterids
- Order: Asterales
- Family: Asteraceae
- Tribe: Heliantheae
- Genus: Acmella
- Species: A. leucantha

Binomial name
- Acmella leucantha (Kunth) R.K.Jansen

Species of flowering plant

Acmella leucantha is a species of flowering plant in the family Asteraceae. It is endemic to Ecuador, where it is known from three locations in the Andes and one on Puná Island. The Andean subpopulations grow in forests and the dry vegetation of mountain valleys. The island subpopulation occurs in coastal habitat. The species is threatened by habitat destruction, including deforestation on Puná Island.
