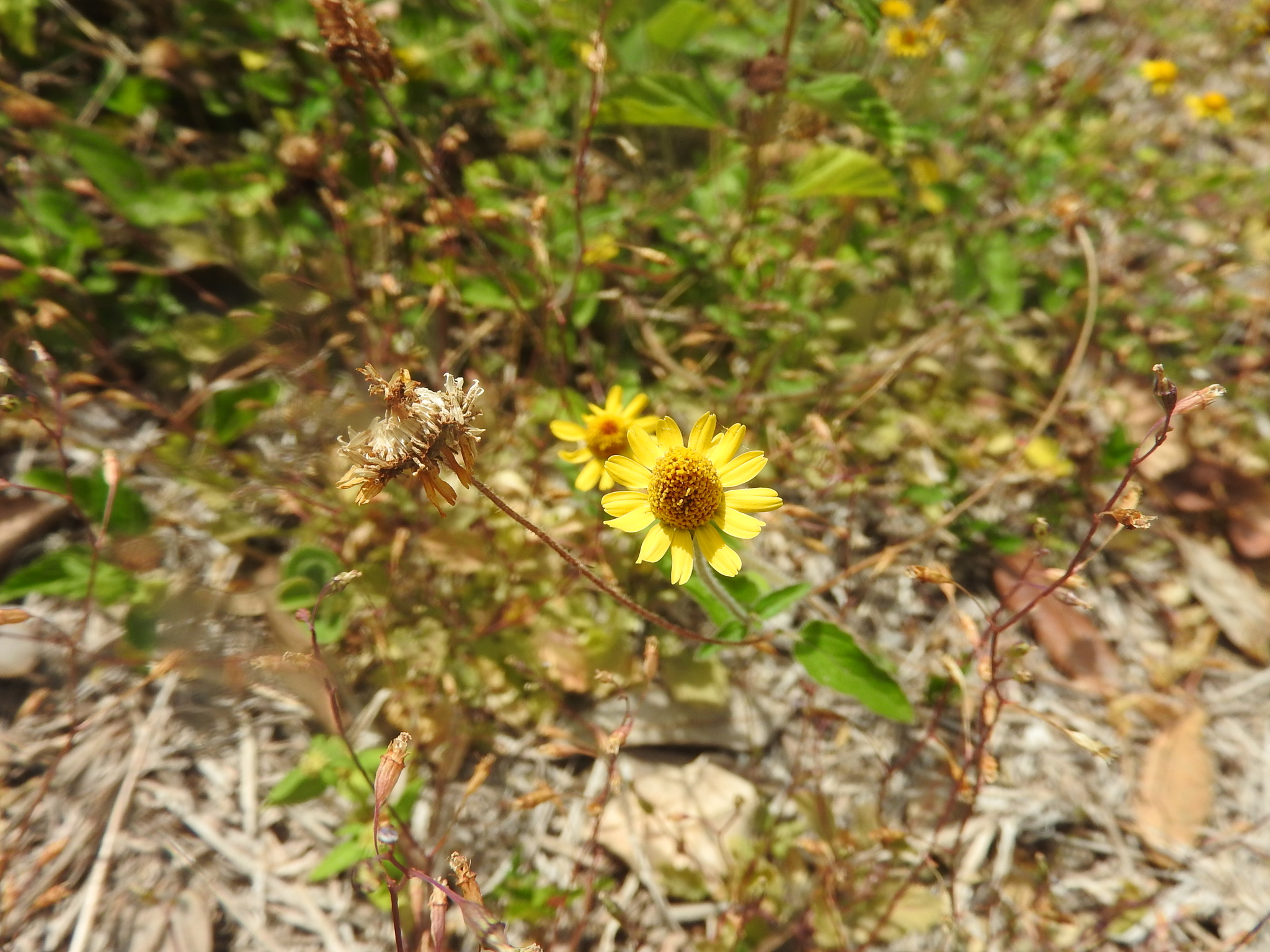

Scientific classification
- Kingdom: Plantae
- Clade: Tracheophytes
- Clade: Angiosperms
- Clade: Eudicots
- Clade: Asterids
- Order: Asterales
- Family: Asteraceae
- Genus: Acmella
- Species: A. pilosa

Binomial name
- Acmella pilosa R.K.Jansen

= Acmella pilosa =

Species of flowering plant

Acmella pilosa, the hairy spotflower, is a Mesoamerican species of flowering plants in the family Asteraceae. It is native to Guatemala, Belize, and southeastern Mexico (Campeche, Quintana Roo, Tabasco). The species is also naturalized in the southern part of the US State of Florida.
