= Toothache =

Medical condition of the teeth

- Other names: Odontalgia, dentalgia, odontodynia, odontogenic pain
- "Thou hell o' a' diseases" – William Hole's illustration for Robert Burns' poem "Address to the Toothache" (1897, poem c. 1786).
- Specialty: Dentistry

Toothaches, also known as dental pain or tooth pain, is pain in the teeth or their supporting structures, caused by dental diseases or pain referred to the teeth by non-dental diseases. When severe it may impact sleep, eating, and other daily activities.

Common causes include inflammation of the pulp (usually in response to tooth decay, dental trauma, or other factors), dentin hypersensitivity, apical periodontitis (inflammation of the periodontal ligament and alveolar bone around the root apex), dental abscesses (localized collections of pus), alveolar osteitis ("dry socket", a possible complication of tooth extraction), acute necrotizing ulcerative gingivitis (a gum infection), and temporomandibular disorder.

Pulpitis is reversible when the pain is mild to moderate and lasts for a short time after a stimulus (for instance cold); or irreversible when the pain is severe, spontaneous, and lasts a long time after a stimulus. Left untreated, pulpitis may become irreversible, then progress to pulp necrosis (death of the pulp) and apical periodontitis. Abscesses usually cause throbbing pain. The apical abscess usually occurs after pulp necrosis, the pericoronal abscess is usually associated with acute pericoronitis of a lower wisdom tooth, and periodontal abscesses usually represent a complication of chronic periodontitis (gum disease). Less commonly, non-dental conditions can cause toothache, such as maxillary sinusitis, which can cause pain in the upper back teeth, or angina pectoris, which can cause pain in the lower teeth. Correct diagnosis can sometimes be challenging.

Proper oral hygiene helps to prevent toothache by preventing dental disease. The treatment of a toothache depends upon the exact cause, and may involve a filling, root canal treatment, extraction, drainage of pus, or other remedial action. The relief of toothache is considered one of the main responsibilities of dentists. Toothache is the most common type of pain in the mouth or face. It is one of the most common reasons for emergency dental appointments. In 2013, 223 million cases of toothache occurred as a result of dental caries in permanent teeth and 53 million cases occurred in baby teeth. Historically, the demand for treatment of toothache is thought to have led to the emergence of dental surgery as the first specialty of medicine.

== Causes ==
Toothache may be caused by dental (odontogenic) conditions (such as those involving the dentin-pulp complex or periodontium), or by non-dental (non-odontogenic) conditions (such as maxillary sinusitis or angina pectoris). There are many possible non-dental causes, but the vast majority of toothache is dental in origin.

Both the pulp and periodontal ligament have nociceptors (pain receptors), but the pulp lacks proprioceptors (motion or position receptors) and mechanoreceptors (mechanical pressure receptors). Consequently, pain originating from the dentin-pulp complex tends to be poorly localized, whereas pain from the periodontal ligament will typically be well localized, although not always.

For instance, the periodontal ligament can detect the pressure exerted when biting on something smaller than a grain of sand (10–30 μm). When a tooth is intentionally stimulated, about 33% of people can correctly identify the tooth, and about 20% cannot narrow the stimulus location down to a group of three teeth. Another typical difference between pulpal and periodontal pain is that the latter is not usually made worse by thermal stimuli.

=== Dental ===
Natural history of dental caries and resultant toothache and odontogenic infection.

==== Pulpal ====
The majority of pulpal toothache falls into one of the following types; however, other rare causes (which do not always fit neatly into these categories) include galvanic pain and barodontalgia.

==== Pulpitis ====
Pulpitis (inflammation of the pulp) can be triggered by various stimuli (insults), including mechanical, thermal, chemical, and bacterial irritants, or rarely barometric changes and ionizing radiation. Common causes include tooth decay, dental trauma (such as a crack or fracture), or a filling with an imperfect seal.

Because the pulp is encased in a rigid outer shell, there is no space to accommodate swelling caused by inflammation. Inflammation therefore increases pressure in the pulp system, potentially compressing the blood vessels which supply the pulp. This may lead to ischemia (lack of oxygen) and necrosis (tissue death). Pulpitis is termed reversible when the inflamed pulp is capable of returning to a state of health, and irreversible when pulp necrosis is inevitable.

Reversible pulpitis is characterized by short-lasting pain triggered by cold and sometimes heat. The symptoms of reversible pulpitis may disappear, either because the noxious stimulus is removed, such as when dental decay is removed and a filling placed, or because new layers of dentin (tertiary dentin) have been produced inside the pulp chamber, insulating against the stimulus. Irreversible pulpitis causes spontaneous or lingering pain in response to cold.

==== Dentin hypersensitivity ====
Dentin hypersensitivity is a sharp, short-lasting dental pain occurring in about 15% of the population, which is triggered by cold (such as liquids or air), sweet or spicy foods, and beverages. Teeth will normally have some sensation to these triggers, but what separates hypersensitivity from regular tooth sensation is the intensity of the pain. Hypersensitivity is most commonly caused by a lack of insulation from the triggers in the mouth due to gingival recession (receding gums) exposing the roots of the teeth, although it can occur after scaling and root planing or dental bleaching, or as a result of erosion. The pulp of the tooth remains normal and healthy in dentin hypersensitivity.

Many topical treatments for dentin hypersensitivity are available, including desensitizing toothpastes and protective varnishes that coat the exposed dentin surface. Treatment of the root cause is critical, as topical measures are typically short lasting. Over time, the pulp usually adapts by producing new layers of dentin inside the pulp chamber called tertiary dentin, increasing the thickness between the pulp and the exposed dentin surface and lessening the hypersensitivity.

==== Periodontal ====
In general, chronic periodontal conditions do not cause any pain. Rather, it is acute inflammation which is responsible for the pain.

===== Apical periodontitis =====
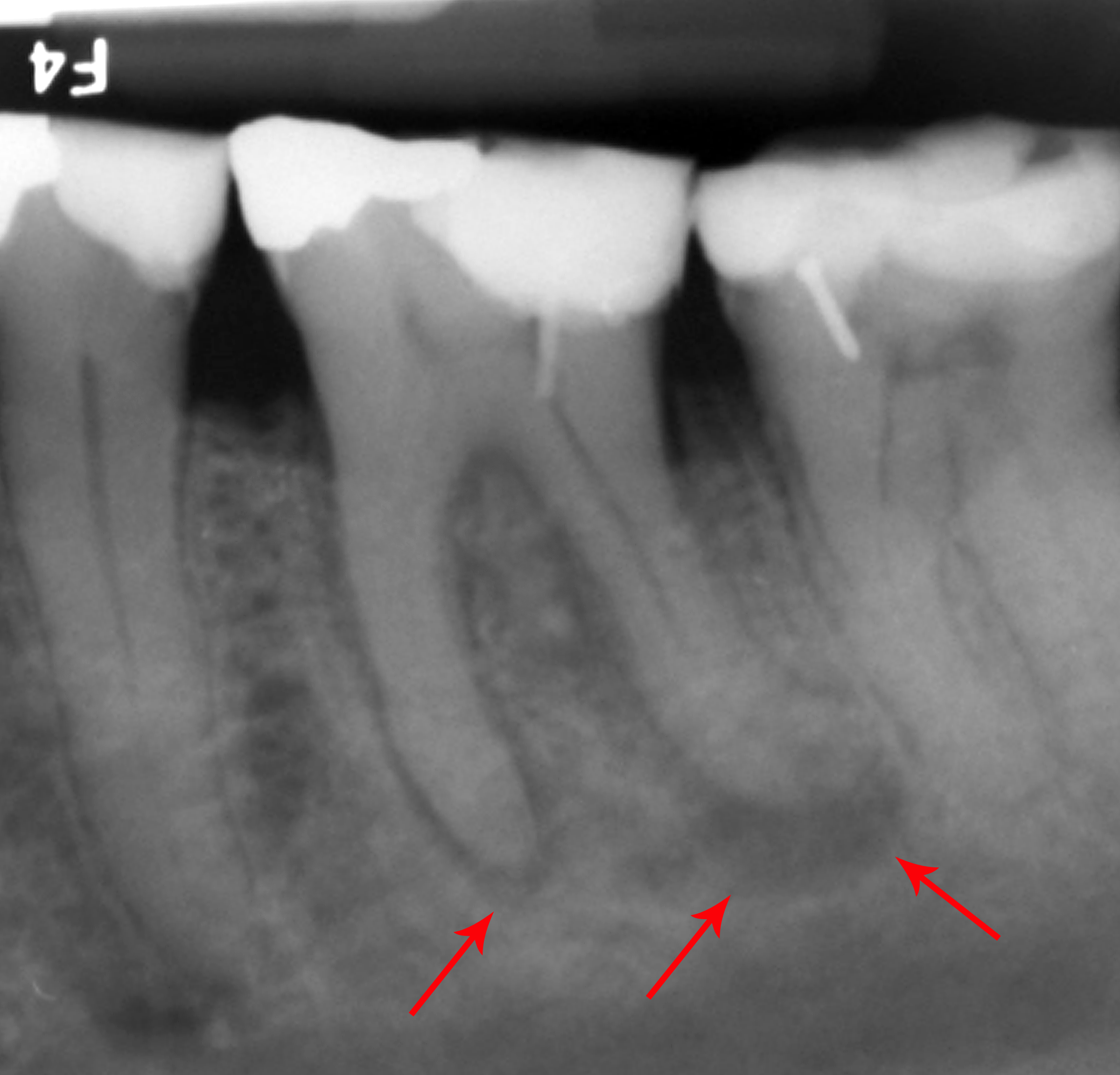
Apical abscess associated with roots of a lower molar.

Apical periodontitis is acute or chronic inflammation around the apex of a tooth caused by an immune response to bacteria within an infected pulp. It does not occur because of pulp necrosis, meaning that a tooth that tests as if it's alive (vital) may cause apical periodontitis, and a pulp which has become non-vital due to a sterile, non-infectious processes (such as trauma) may not cause any apical periodontitis. Bacterial cytotoxins reach the region around the roots of the tooth via the apical foramina and lateral canals, causing vasodilation, sensitization of nerves, osteolysis (bone resorption) and potentially abscess or cyst formation.

The periodontal ligament becomes inflamed and there may be pain when biting or tapping on the tooth. On an X-ray, bone resorption appears as a radiolucent area around the end of the root, although this does not manifest immediately. Acute apical periodontitis is characterized by well-localized, spontaneous, persistent, moderate to severe pain. The alveolar process may be tender to palpation over the roots. The tooth may be raised in the socket and feel more prominent than the adjacent teeth.

===== Food impaction =====
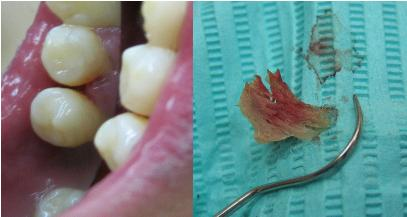
An open contact of approximately 1.5 mm shown between two posterior teeth. The meat, at right, was recovered from the open contact more than 8 hours after the person had last eaten meat, even though they had brushed the teeth twice since.

Food impaction occurs when food debris, especially fibrous food such as meat, becomes trapped between two teeth and is pushed into the gums during chewing. The usual cause of food impaction is disruption of the normal interproximal contour or drifting of teeth so that a gap is created (an open contact). Decay can lead to collapse of part of the tooth, or a dental restoration may not accurately reproduce the contact point. Irritation, localized discomfort or mild pain and a feeling of pressure from between the two teeth results. The gingival papilla is swollen, tender and bleeds when touched. The pain occurs during and after eating, and may slowly disappear before being evoked again at the next meal, (Note: This pattern of pain should be distinguished from the "meal time syndrome" of certain salivary gland diseases.) or relieved immediately by using a tooth pick or dental floss in the involved area. A gingival or periodontal abscess may develop from this situation.

===== Periodontal abscess =====
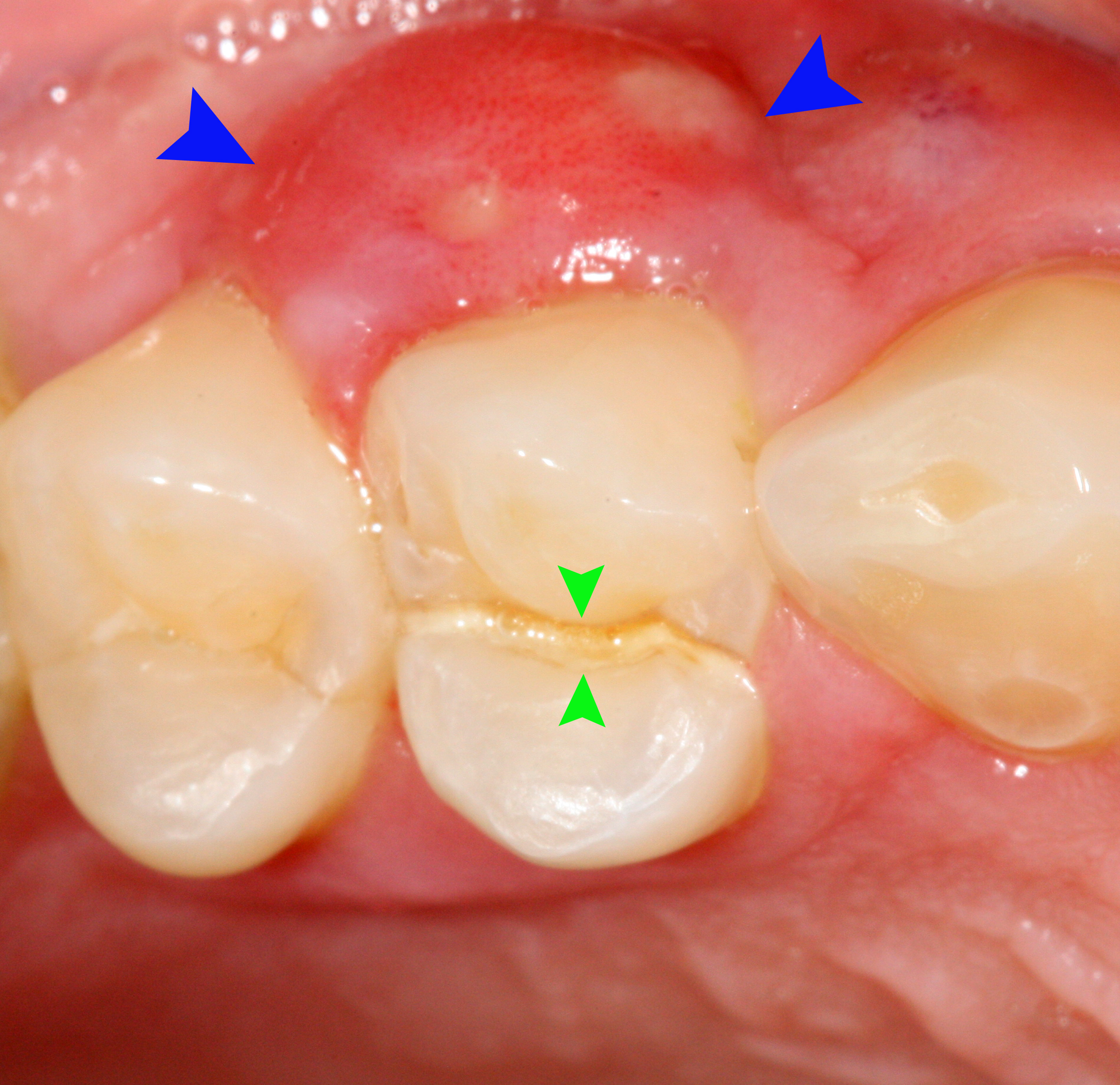
Lateral periodontal abscess (blue arrows) due to a fracture (green arrows)

A periodontal abscess (lateral abscess) is a collection of pus that forms in the gingival crevices, usually as a result of chronic periodontitis where the pockets are pathologically deepened greater than 3mm. A healthy gingival pocket will contain bacteria and some calculus kept in check by the immune system. As the pocket deepens, the balance is disrupted, and an acute inflammatory response results, forming pus. The debris and swelling then disrupt the normal flow of fluids into and out of the pocket, rapidly accelerating the inflammatory cycle. Larger pockets also have a greater likelihood of collecting food debris, creating additional sources of infection.

Periodontal abscesses are less common than apical abscesses, but are still frequent. The key difference between the two is that the pulp of the tooth tends to be alive, and will respond normally to pulp tests. However, an untreated periodontal abscess may still cause the pulp to die if it reaches the tooth apex in a periodontic-endodontic lesion. A periodontal abscess can occur as the result of tooth fracture, food packing into a periodontal pocket (with poorly shaped fillings), calculus build-up, and lowered immune responses (such as in diabetes). Periodontal abscess can also occur after periodontal scaling, which causes the gums to tighten around the teeth and trap debris in the pocket. Toothache caused by a periodontal abscess is generally deep and throbbing. The oral mucosa covering an early periodontal abscess appears erythematous (red), swollen, shiny, and painful to touch.

A variant of the periodontal abscess is the gingival abscess, which is limited to the gingival margin, has a quicker onset, and is typically caused by trauma from items such as a fishbone, toothpick, or toothbrush, rather than chronic periodontitis. The treatment of a periodontal abscess is similar to the management of dental abscesses in general (see: Treatment). However, since the tooth is typically alive, there is no difficulty in accessing the source of infection and, therefore, antibiotics are more routinely used in conjunction with scaling and root planing. The occurrence of a periodontal abscess usually indicates advanced periodontal disease, which requires correct management to prevent recurrent abscesses, including daily cleaning below the gumline to prevent the buildup of subgingival plaque and calculus.

===== Acute necrotizing ulcerative gingivitis =====
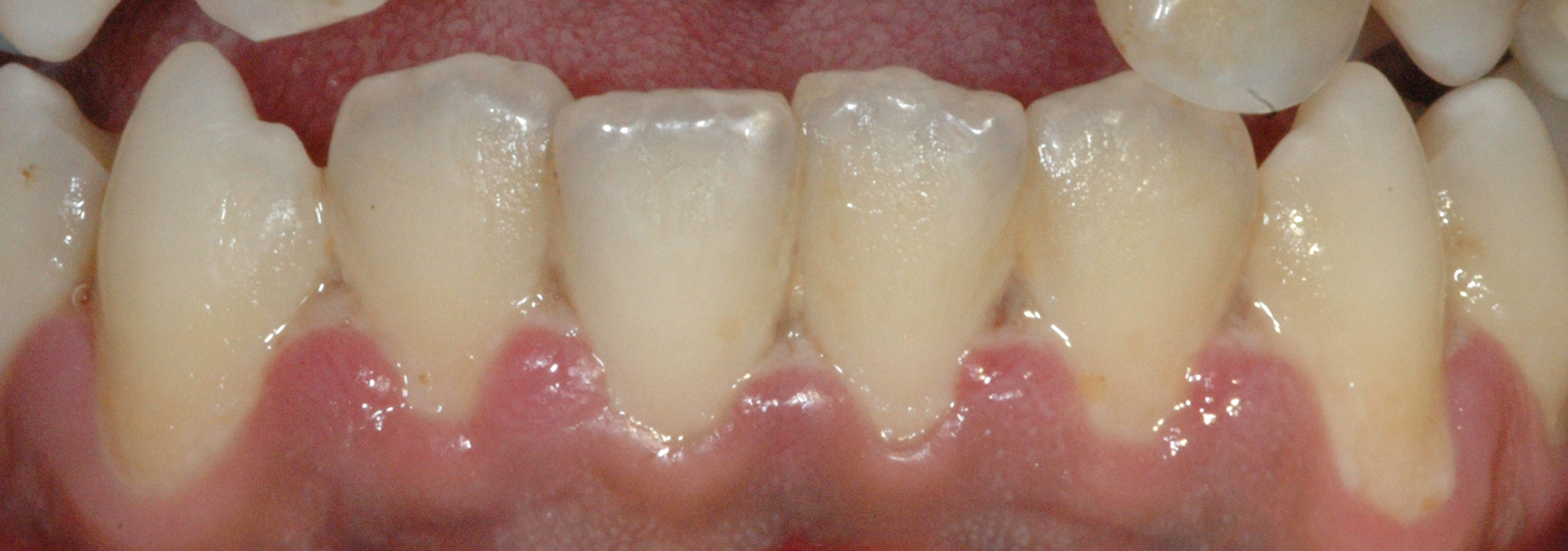
Mild presentation of ANUG on the gums of the lower front teeth

Common marginal gingivitis in response to subgingival plaque is usually a painless condition. However, an acute form of gingivitis/periodontitis, termed acute necrotizing ulcerative gingivitis (ANUG), can develop, often suddenly. It is associated with severe periodontal pain, bleeding gums, "punched out" ulceration, loss of the interdental papillae, and possibly also halitosis (bad breath) and a bad taste. Predisposing factors include poor oral hygiene, smoking, malnutrition, psychological stress, and immunosuppression. This condition is not contagious, but multiple cases may simultaneously occur in populations who share the same risk factors (such as students in a dormitory during a period of examination). ANUG is treated over several visits, first with debridement of the necrotic gingiva, homecare with hydrogen peroxide mouthwash, analgesics and, when the pain has subsided sufficiently, cleaning below the gumline, both professionally and at home. Antibiotics are not indicated in ANUG management unless there is underlying systemic disease.

===== Pericoronitis =====
Clinical & xray correlation of pericoronitis

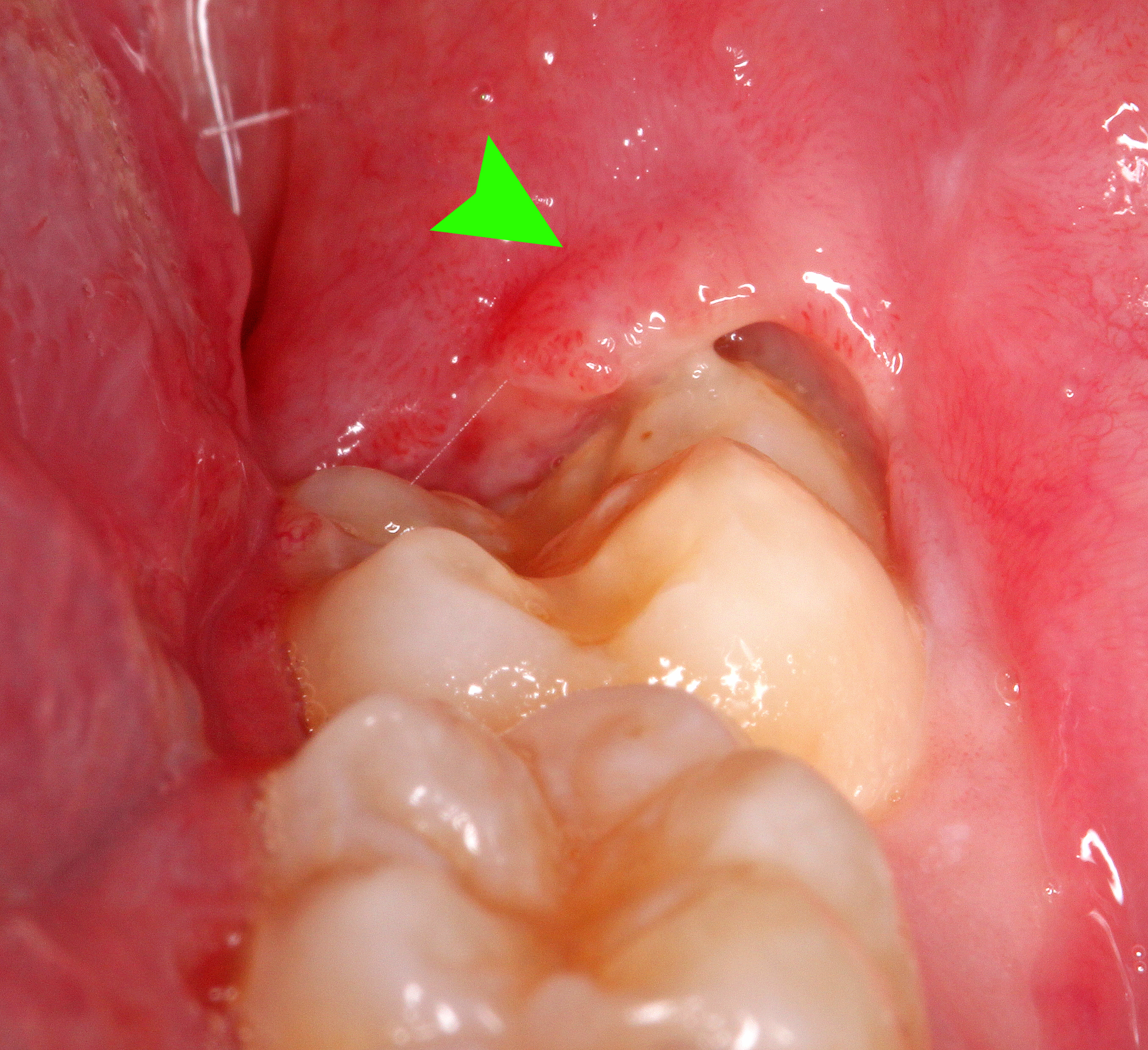
An operculum (green arrow) over a partially erupted lower left third molar tooth. There is minimal inflammation and recurrent swelling.

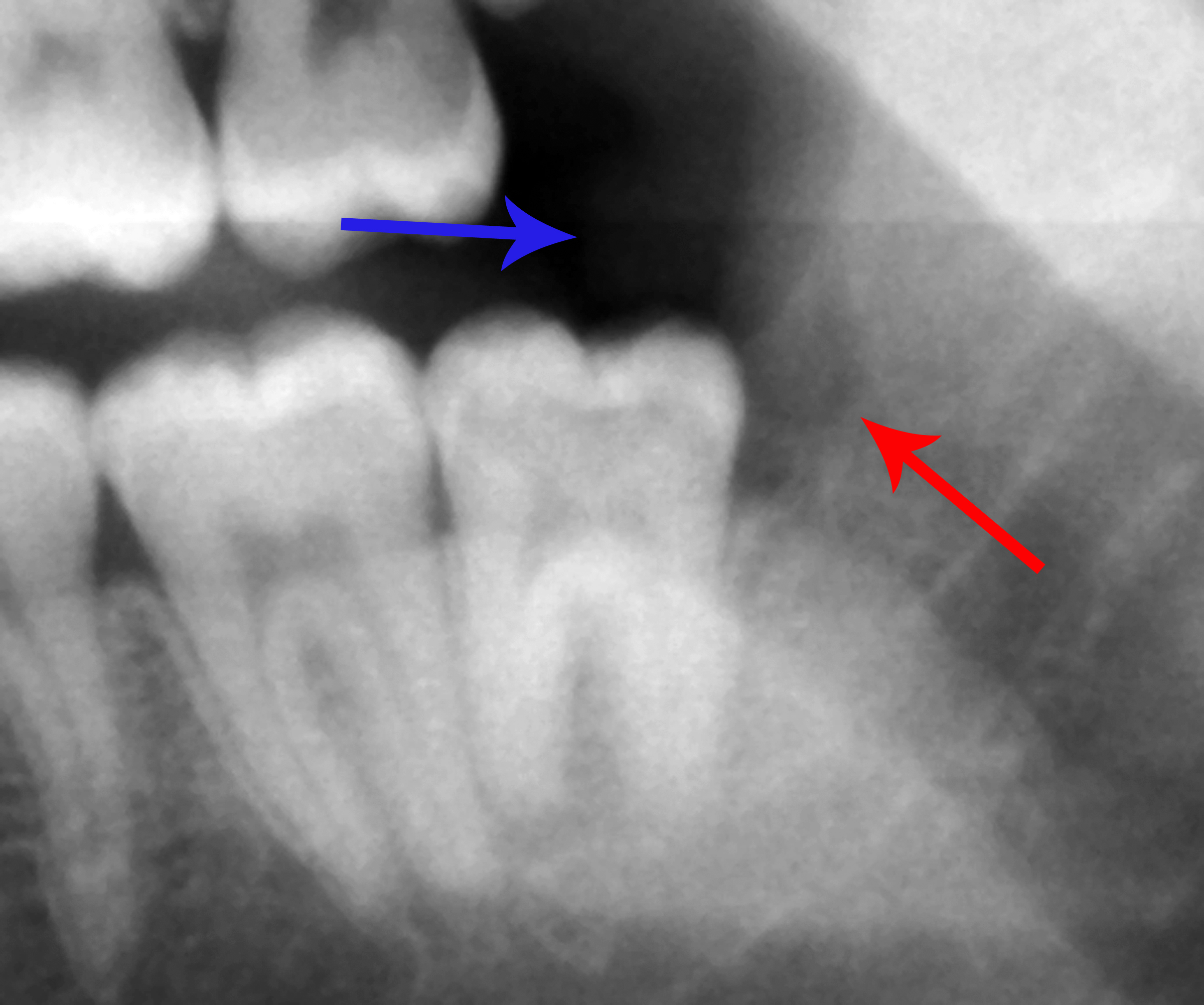
A radiograph of the above tooth showing chronic pericoronitis, operculum (blue arrow) and bone destruction (red arrow) from chronic inflammation. Tooth is slightly disto-angular.

Pericoronitis is inflammation of the soft tissues surrounding the crown of a partially erupted tooth. The lower wisdom tooth is the last tooth to erupt into the mouth, and is, therefore, more frequently impacted, or stuck, against the other teeth. This leaves the tooth partially erupted into the mouth, and there frequently is a flap of gum (an operculum), overlying the tooth. Bacteria and food debris accumulate beneath the operculum, which is an area that is difficult to keep clean because it is hidden and far back in the mouth. The opposing upper wisdom tooth also tends to have sharp cusps and over-erupt because it has no opposing tooth to bite into, and instead traumatizes the operculum further. Periodontitis and dental caries may develop on either the third or second molars, and chronic inflammation develops in the soft tissues. Chronic pericoronitis may not cause any pain, but an acute pericoronitis episode is often associated with pericoronal abscess formation. Typical signs and symptoms of a pericoronal abscess include severe, throbbing pain, which may radiate to adjacent areas in the head and neck, redness, swelling and tenderness of the gum over the tooth. There may be trismus (difficulty opening the mouth), facial swelling, and rubor (flushing) of the cheek that overlies the angle of the jaw. Persons typically develop pericoronitis in their late teens and early 20s, as this is the age that the wisdom teeth are erupting. Treatment for acute conditions includes cleaning the area under the operculum with an antiseptic solution, painkillers, and antibiotics if indicated. After the acute episode has been controlled, the definitive treatment is usually by tooth extraction or, less commonly, the soft tissue is removed (operculectomy). If the tooth is kept, good oral hygiene is required to keep the area free of debris to prevent recurrence of the infection.

===== Occlusal trauma =====
Occlusal trauma results from excessive biting forces exerted on teeth, which overloads the periodontal ligament, causing periodontal pain and a reversible increase in tooth mobility. Occlusal trauma may occur with bruxism, the parafunctional (abnormal) clenching and grinding of teeth during sleep or while awake. Over time, there may be attrition (tooth wear), which may also cause dentin hypersensitivity, and possibly formation of a periodontal abscess, as the occlusal trauma causes adaptive changes in the alveolar bone.

Occlusal trauma often occurs when a newly placed dental restoration is built too "high", concentrating the biting forces on one tooth. Height differences measuring less than a millimeter can cause pain. Dentists, therefore, routinely check that any new restoration is in harmony with the bite and forces are distributed correctly over many teeth using articulating paper. If the high spot is quickly eliminated, the pain disappears and there is no permanent harm. Over-tightening of braces can cause periodontal pain and, occasionally, a periodontal abscess.

===== Alveolar osteitis =====
Alveolar osteitis is a complication of tooth extraction (especially lower wisdom teeth) in which the blood clot is not formed or is lost, leaving the socket where the tooth used to be empty, and bare bone is exposed to the mouth. The pain is moderate to severe, and dull, aching, and throbbing in character. The pain is localized to the socket, and may radiate. It normally starts two to four days after the extraction, and may last 10–40 days. Healing is delayed, and it is treated with local anesthetic dressings, which are typically required for five to seven days. There is some evidence that chlorhexidine mouthwash used prior to extractions prevents alveolar osteitis.

==== Combined pulpal-periodontal ====
===== Dental trauma and cracked tooth syndrome =====
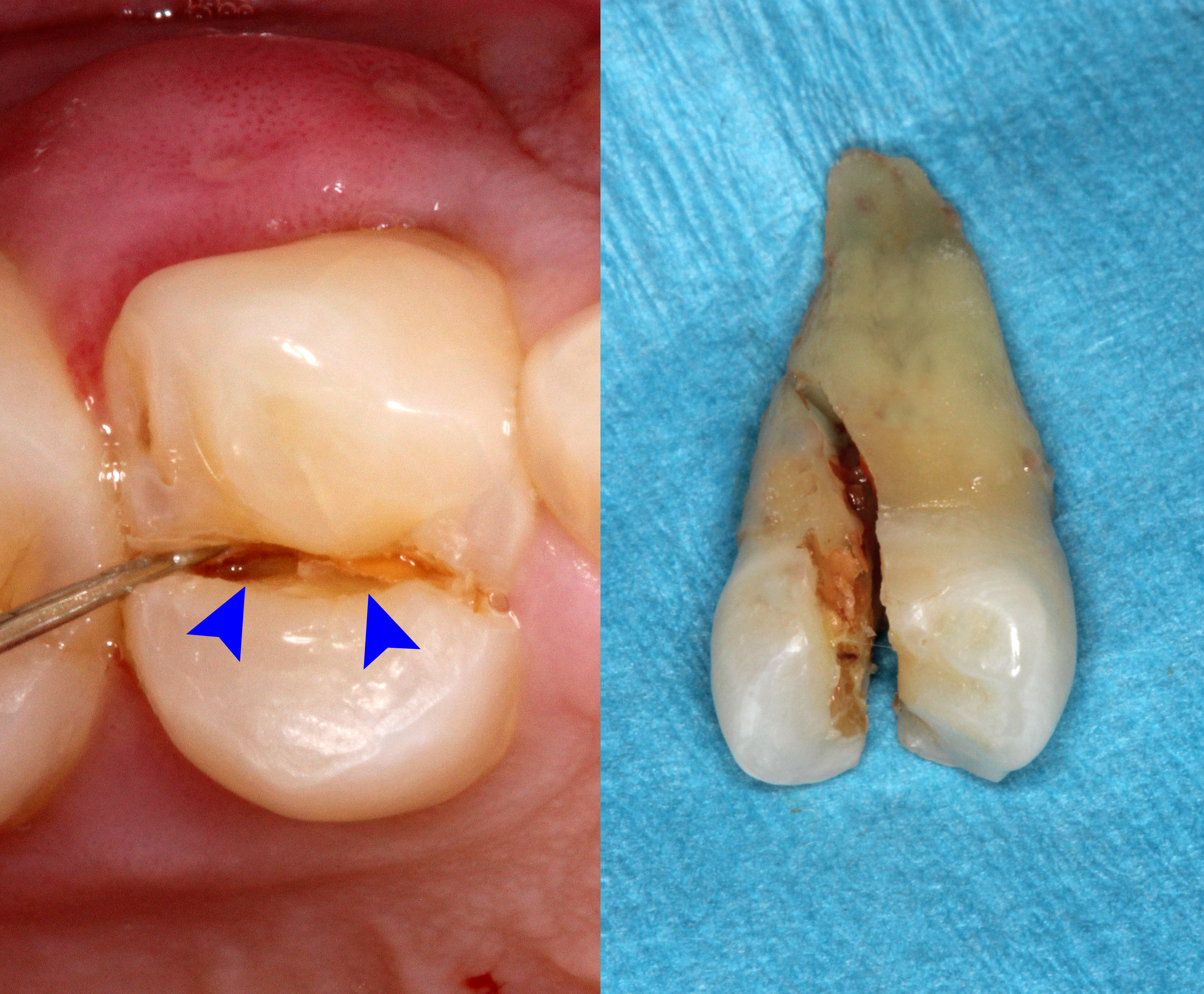
Crown-root fracture with pulp involvement (left). Extracted (right).

Cracked tooth syndrome refers to a highly variable set of pain-sensitivity symptoms that may accompany a tooth fracture, usually sporadic, sharp pain that occurs during biting or with release of biting pressure, or relieved by releasing pressure on the tooth. The term is falling into disfavor and has given way to the more generalized description of fractures and cracks of the tooth, which allows for the wide variations in signs, symptoms, and prognosis for traumatized teeth. A fracture of a tooth can involve the enamel, dentin, and/or pulp, and can be orientated horizontally or vertically. Fractured or cracked teeth can cause pain via several mechanisms, including dentin hypersensitivity, pulpitis (reversible or irreversible), or periodontal pain. Accordingly, there is no single test or combination of symptoms that accurately diagnose a fracture or crack, although when pain can be stimulated by causing separation of the cusps of the tooth, it's highly suggestive of the disorder. Vertical fractures can be very difficult to identify because the crack can rarely be probed or seen on radiographs, as the fracture runs in the plane of conventional films (similar to how the split between two adjacent panes of glass is invisible when facing them).

When toothache results from dental trauma (regardless of the exact pulpal or periodontal diagnosis), the treatment and prognosis is dependent on the extent of damage to the tooth, the stage of development of the tooth, the degree of displacement or, when the tooth is avulsed, the time out of the socket and the starting health of the tooth and bone. Because of the high variation in treatment and prognosis, dentists often use trauma guides to help determine prognosis and direct treatment decisions.

The prognosis for a cracked tooth varies with the extent of the fracture. Those cracks that are irritating the pulp but do not extend through the pulp chamber can be amenable to stabilizing dental restorations such as a crown or composite resin. Should the fracture extend though the pulp chamber and into the root, the prognosis of the tooth is hopeless.

===== Periodontic-endodontic lesion =====
Apical abscesses can spread to involve periodontal pockets around a tooth, and periodontal pockets cause eventual pulp necrosis via accessory canals or the apical foramen at the bottom of the tooth. Such lesions are termed periodontic-endodontic lesions, and they may be acutely painful, sharing similar signs and symptoms with a periodontal abscess, or they may cause mild pain or no pain at all if they are chronic and free-draining. Successful root canal therapy is required before periodontal treatment is attempted. Generally, the long-term prognosis of perio-endo lesions is poor.

=== Non-dental ===
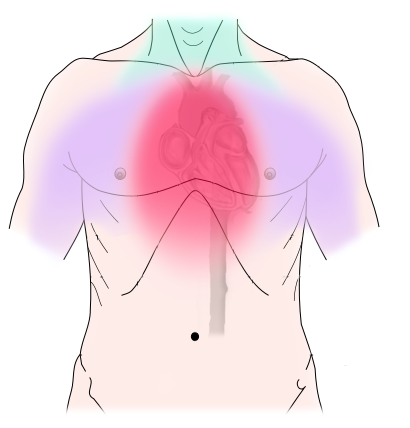
Discomfort caused by coronary artery disease can radiate to the neck, lower jaw and teeth

Non-dental causes of toothache are much less common as compared with dental causes. In a toothache of neurovascular origin, pain is reported in the teeth in conjunction with a migraine. Local and distant structures (such as ear, brain, carotid artery, or heart) can also refer pain to the teeth. Other non-dental causes of toothache include myofascial pain (muscle pain) and angina pectoris (which classically refers pain to the lower jaw). Very rarely, toothache can be psychogenic in origin.

Disorders of the maxillary sinus can be referred to the upper back teeth. The posterior, middle and anterior superior alveolar nerves are all closely associated with the lining of the sinus. The bone between the floor of the maxillary sinus and the roots of the upper back teeth is very thin, and frequently the apices of these teeth disrupt the contour of the sinus floor. Consequently, acute or chronic maxillary sinusitis can be perceived as maxillary toothache, and neoplasms of the sinus (such as adenoid cystic carcinoma) can cause similarly perceived toothache if malignant invasion of the superior alveolar nerves occurs. Classically, sinusitis pain increases upon Valsalva maneuvers or tilting the head forward.

Painful conditions which do not originate from the teeth or their supporting structures may affect the oral mucosa of the gums and be interpreted by the individual as toothache. Examples include neoplasms of the gingival or alveolar mucosa (usually squamous cell carcinoma), conditions which cause gingivostomatitis and desquamative gingivitis. Various conditions may involve the alveolar bone, and cause non-odontogenic toothache, such as Burkitt's lymphoma, infarcts in the jaws caused by sickle cell disease, and osteomyelitis. Various conditions of the trigeminal nerve can masquerade as toothache, including trigeminal zoster (maxillary or mandibular division), trigeminal neuralgia, cluster headache, and trigeminal neuropathies. Very rarely, a brain tumor might cause toothache. Another chronic facial pain syndrome which can mimic toothache is temporomandibular disorder (temporomandibular joint pain-dysfunction syndrome), which is very common. Toothache which has no identifiable dental or medical cause is often termed atypical odontalgia, which, in turn, is usually considered a type of atypical facial pain (or persistent idiopathic facial pain). Atypical odontalgia may give very unusual symptoms, such as pain which migrates from one tooth to another and which crosses anatomical boundaries (such as from the left teeth to the right teeth).

== Pathophysiology ==
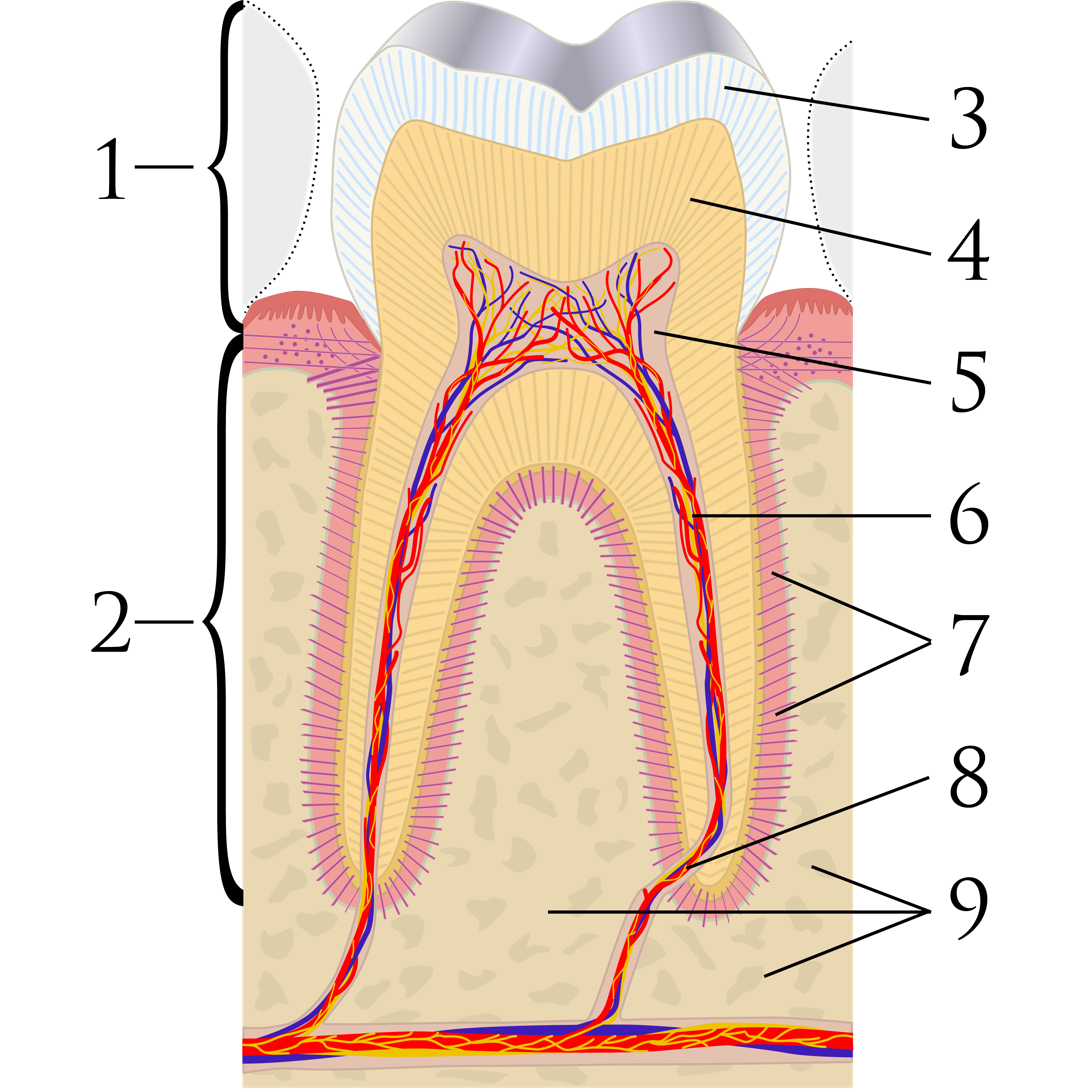
1: crown, 2: root, 3: enamel, 4: dentin and dentin tubules, 5: pulp chamber, 6: blood vessels and nerve within root canal, 7: periodontal ligament, 8: apex and periapical region, 9: alveolar bone.

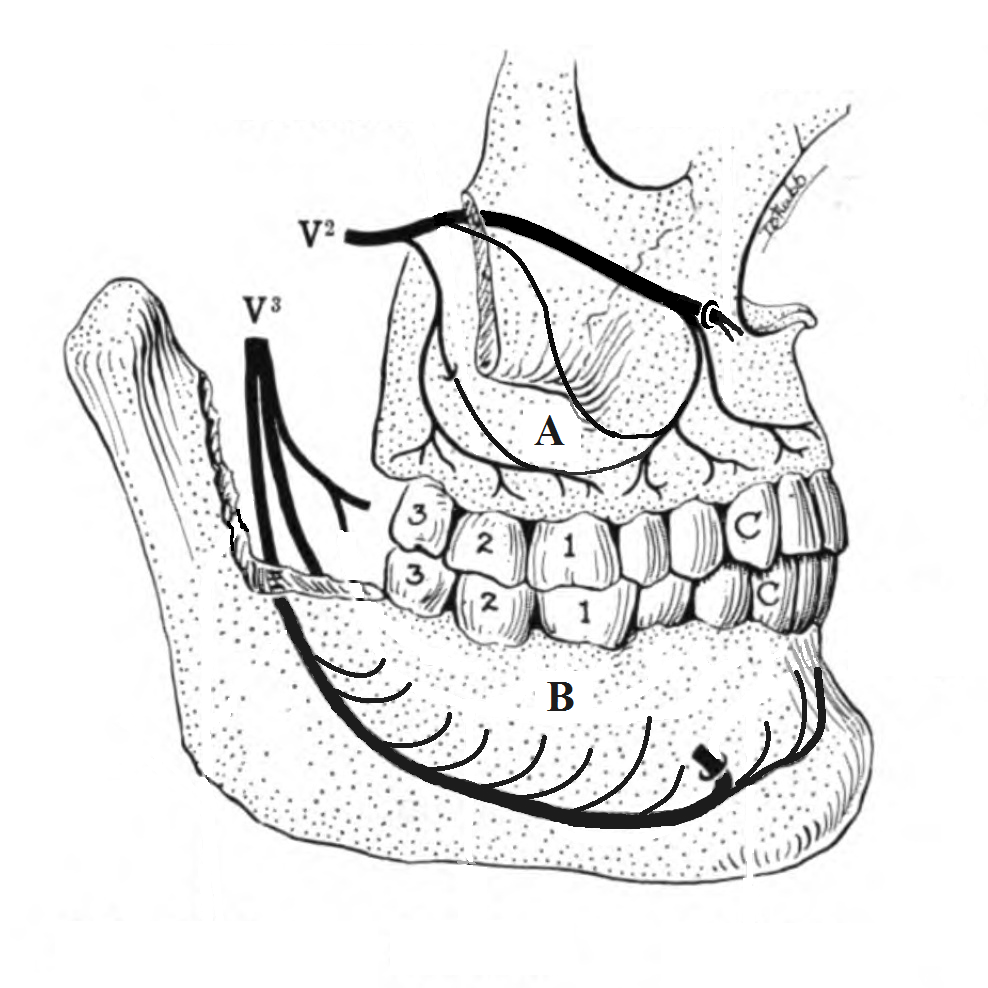
V^{2}: maxillary division of trigeminal nerve, V^{3}: mandibular division of trigeminal nerve, A: the superior alveolar nerves and plexus, B: the inferior alveolar nerve and plexus running in the body of the mandible.

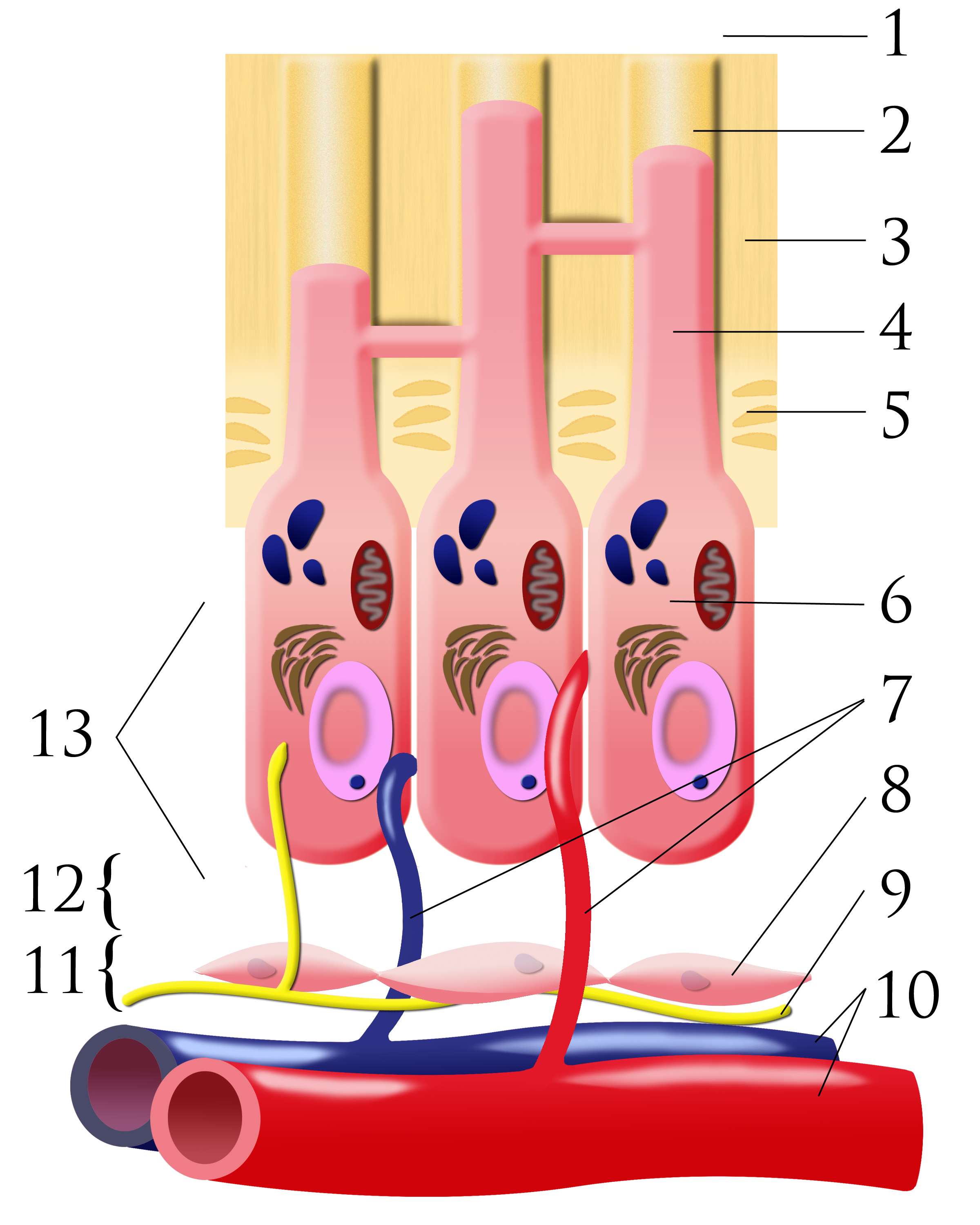
Dentin-pulp complex. 1: tooth/enamel, 2: dentin tubule, 3: dentin, 4: odontoblastic process, 5: predentin, 6: odontoblast, 7: capillaries, 8: fibroblasts, 9: nerve, 10: artery/vein, 11: cell-rich zone, 12: cell-poor zone, 13: pulp chamber.

A tooth is composed of an outer shell of calcified hard tissues (from hardest to softest: enamel, dentin, and cementum), and an inner soft tissue core (the pulp system), which contains nerves and blood vessels. The visible parts of the teeth in the mouth – the crowns (covered by enamel) – are anchored into the bone by the roots (covered by cementum). Underneath the cementum and enamel layers, dentin forms the bulk of the tooth and surrounds the pulp system. The part of the pulp inside the crown is the pulp chamber, and the central soft tissue nutrient canals within each root are root canals, exiting through one or more holes at the root end (apical foramen/foramina). The periodontal ligament connects the roots to the bony socket. The gingiva covers the alveolar processes, the tooth-bearing arches of the jaws.

Enamel is not a vital tissue, as it lacks blood vessels, nerves, and living cells. Consequently, pathologic processes involving only enamel, such as shallow cavities or cracks, tend to be painless. Dentin contains many microscopic tubes containing fluid and the processes of odontoblast cells, which communicate with the pulp. Mechanical, osmotic, or other stimuli cause movement of this fluid, triggering nerves in the pulp (the "hydrodynamic theory" of pulp sensitivity). Due to the close relationship between dentin and pulp, they are frequently considered together as the dentin-pulp complex.

The teeth and gums exhibit normal sensations in health. Such sensations are generally sharp, lasting as long as the stimulus. There is a continuous spectrum from physiologic sensation to pain in disease. Pain is an unpleasant sensation caused by intense or damaging events. In a toothache, nerves are stimulated by either exogenous sources (for instance, bacterial toxins, metabolic byproducts, chemicals, or trauma) or endogenous factors (such as inflammatory mediators).

The pain pathway is mostly transmitted via myelinated Aδ (sharp or stabbing pain) and unmyelinated C nerve fibers (slow, dull, aching, or burning pain) of the trigeminal nerve, which supplies sensation to the teeth and gums via many divisions and branches. Initially, pain is felt while noxious stimuli are applied (such as cold). Continued exposure decreases firing thresholds of the nerves, allowing normally non-painful stimuli to trigger pain (allodynia). Should the insult continue, noxious stimuli produce larger discharges in the nerve, perceived as more intense pain. Spontaneous pain may occur if the firing threshold is decreased so it can fire without stimulus (hyperalgesia). The physical component of pain is processed in the medullary spinal cord and perceived in the frontal cortex. Because pain perception involves overlapping sensory systems and an emotional component, individual responses to identical stimuli are variable.

== Diagnosis ==
The diagnosis of toothache can be challenging, not only because the list of potential causes is extensive, but also because dental pain may be extremely variable, and pain can be referred to and from the teeth. Dental pain can simulate virtually any facial pain syndrome. However, the vast majority of toothache is caused by dental, rather than non-dental, sources. Consequently, the saying "horses, not zebras" has been applied to the differential diagnosis of orofacial pain. That is, everyday dental causes (such as pulpitis) should always be considered before unusual, non-dental causes (such as myocardial infarction). In the wider context of orofacial pain, all cases of orofacial pain may be considered as having a dental origin until proven otherwise. The diagnostic approach for toothache is generally carried out in the following sequence: history, followed by examination, and investigations. All this information is then collated and used to build a clinical picture, and a differential diagnosis can be carried out.

=== Symptoms ===
The chief complaint, and the onset of the complaint, are usually important in the diagnosis of toothache. For example, the key distinction between reversible and irreversible pulpitis is given in the history, such as pain following a stimulus in the former, and lingering pain following a stimulus and spontaneous pain in the latter. History is also important in recent filling or other dental treatment, and trauma to the teeth. Based on the most common causes of toothache (dentin hypersensitivity, periodontitis, and pulpitis), the key indicators become localization of the pain (whether the pain is perceived as originating in a specific tooth), thermal sensitivity, pain on biting, spontaneity of the pain, and factors that make the pain worse.The various qualities of the toothache, such as the effect of biting and chewing on the pain, the effect of thermal stimuli, and the effect of the pain on sleep, are verbally established by the clinician, usually in a systematic fashion, such as using the Socrates pain assessment method (see table).

From the history, indicators of pulpal, periodontal, a combination of both, or non-dental causes can be observed. Periodontal pain is frequently localized to a particular tooth, which is made much worse by biting on the tooth, sudden in onset, and associated with bleeding and pain when brushing. More than one factor may be involved in the toothache. For example, a pulpal abscess (which is typically severe, spontaneous and localized) can cause periapical periodontitis (which results in pain on biting). Cracked tooth syndrome may also cause a combination of symptoms. Lateral periodontitis (which is usually without any thermal sensitivity and sensitive to biting) can cause pulpitis and the tooth becomes sensitive to cold.

Non-dental sources of pain often cause multiple teeth to hurt and have an epicenter that is either above or below the jaws. For instance, cardiac pain (which can make the bottom teeth hurt) usually radiates up from the chest and neck, and sinusitis (which can make the back top teeth hurt) is worsened by bending over. As all of these conditions may mimic toothache, it is possible that dental treatment, such as fillings, root canal treatment, or tooth extraction may be carried out unnecessarily by dentists in an attempt to relieve the individual's pain, and as a result the correct diagnosis is delayed. A hallmark is that there is no obvious dental cause, and signs and symptoms elsewhere in the body may be present. As migraines are typically present for many years, the diagnosis is easier to make. Often the character of the pain is the differentiator between dental and non-dental pain.

Irreversible pulpitis progresses to pulp necrosis, wherein the nerves are non-functional, and a pain-free period following the severe pain of irreversible pulpitis may be experienced. However, it is common for irreversible pulpitis to progress to apical periodontitis, including an acute apical abscess, without treatment. As irreversible pulpitis generates an apical abscess, the character of the toothache may simply change without any pain-free period. For instance, the pain becomes well localized, and biting on the tooth becomes painful. Hot drinks can make the tooth feel worse because they expand the gases and likewise, cold can make it feel better, thus some will sip cold water.

=== Examination ===
The clinical examination narrows the source down to a specific tooth, teeth, or a non-dental cause. Clinical examination moves from the outside to the inside, and from the general to the specific. Outside of the mouth, the sinuses, muscles of the face and neck, the temporomandibular joints, and cervical lymph nodes are palpated for pain or swelling. In the mouth, the soft tissues of the gingiva, mucosa, tongue, and pharynx are examined for redness, swelling or deformity. Finally, the teeth are examined. Each tooth that may be painful is percussed (tapped), palpated at the base of the root, and probed with a dental explorer for dental caries and a periodontal probe for periodontitis, then wiggled for mobility.

Sometimes the symptoms reported in the history are misleading and point the examiner to the wrong area of the mouth. For instance, sometimes people may mistake pain from pulpitis in a lower tooth as pain in the upper teeth, and vice versa. In other instances, the apparent examination findings may be misleading and lead to the wrong diagnosis and wrong treatment. Pus from a pericoronal abscess associated with a lower third molar may drain along the submucosal plane and discharge as a parulis over the roots of the teeth towards the front of the mouth (a "migratory abscess"). Another example is decay of the tooth root which is hidden from view below the gumline, giving the casual appearance of a sound tooth if careful periodontal examination is not carried out.

Factors indicating infection include movement of fluid in the tissues during palpation (fluctuance), swollen lymph nodes in the neck, and fever with an oral temperature more than 37.7 °C.

=== Investigations ===
Any tooth that is identified, in either the history of pain or base clinical exam, as a source for toothache may undergo further testing for vitality of the dental pulp, infection, fractures, or periodontitis. These tests may include:

- Pulp sensitivity tests, usually carried out with a cotton wool pledget sprayed with ethyl chloride to serve as a cold stimulus, or with an electric pulp tester. The air spray from a three-in-one syringe may also be used to demonstrate areas of dentin hypersensitivity. Heat tests can also be applied with hot Gutta-percha. A healthy tooth will feel the cold but the pain will be mild and disappear once the stimulus is removed. The accuracy of these tests has been reported as 86% for cold testing, 81% for electric pulp testing, and 71% for heat testing. Because of the lack of test sensitivity, a second symptom should be present or a positive test before making a diagnosis.
- Radiographs utilized to find dental caries and bone loss laterally or at the apex.
- Assessment of biting on individual teeth (which sometimes helps to localize the problem) or the separate cusps (may help to detect cracked cusp syndrome).

Less commonly used tests might include trans-illumination (to detect congestion of the maxillary sinus or to highlight a crack in a tooth), dyes (to help visualize a crack), a test cavity, selective anaesthesia and laser doppler flowmetry.

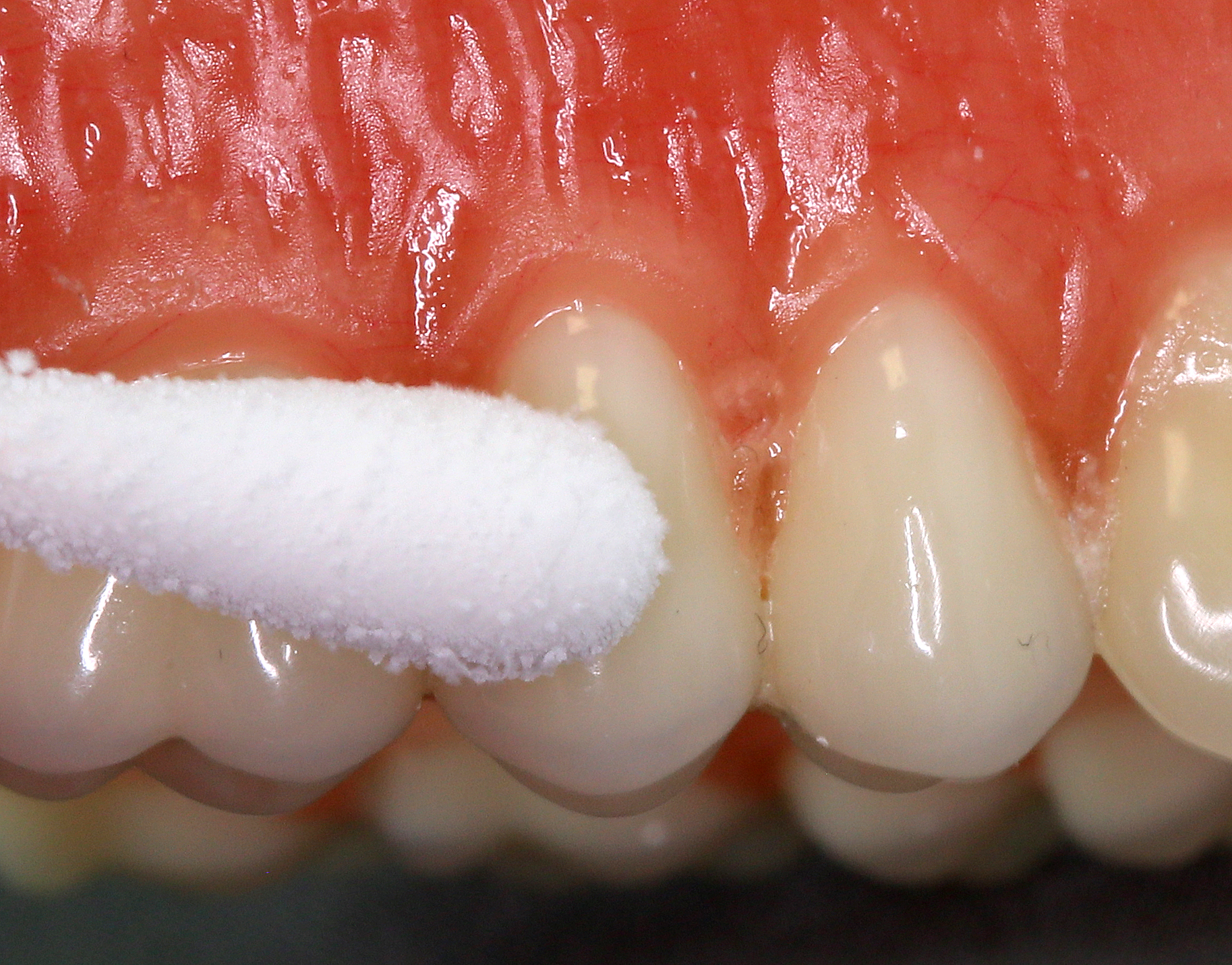
Pulp sensibility test using ethyl chloride (cold stimulus)

Electric pulp tester

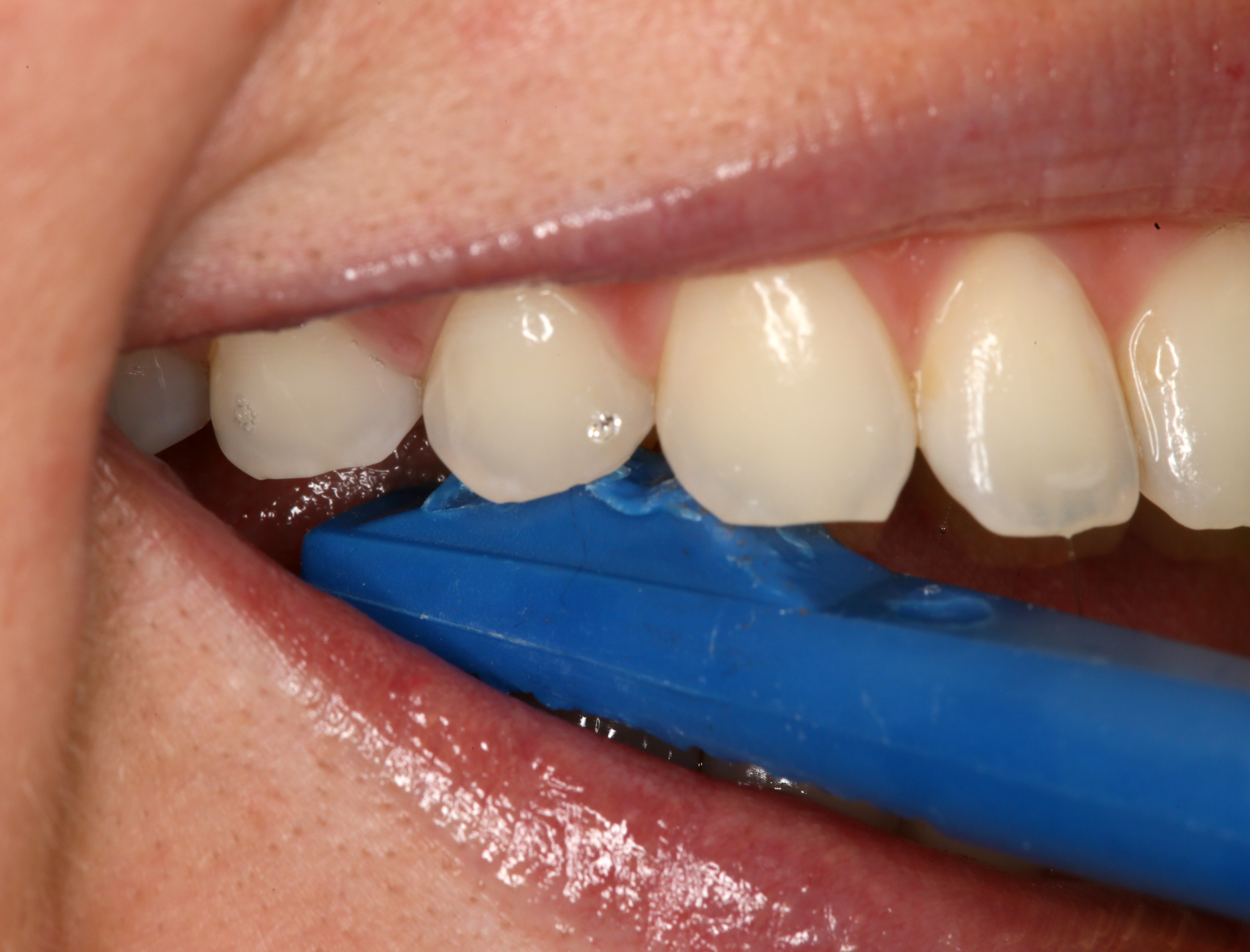
Plastic wedge to identify pain on biting from a fractured tooth

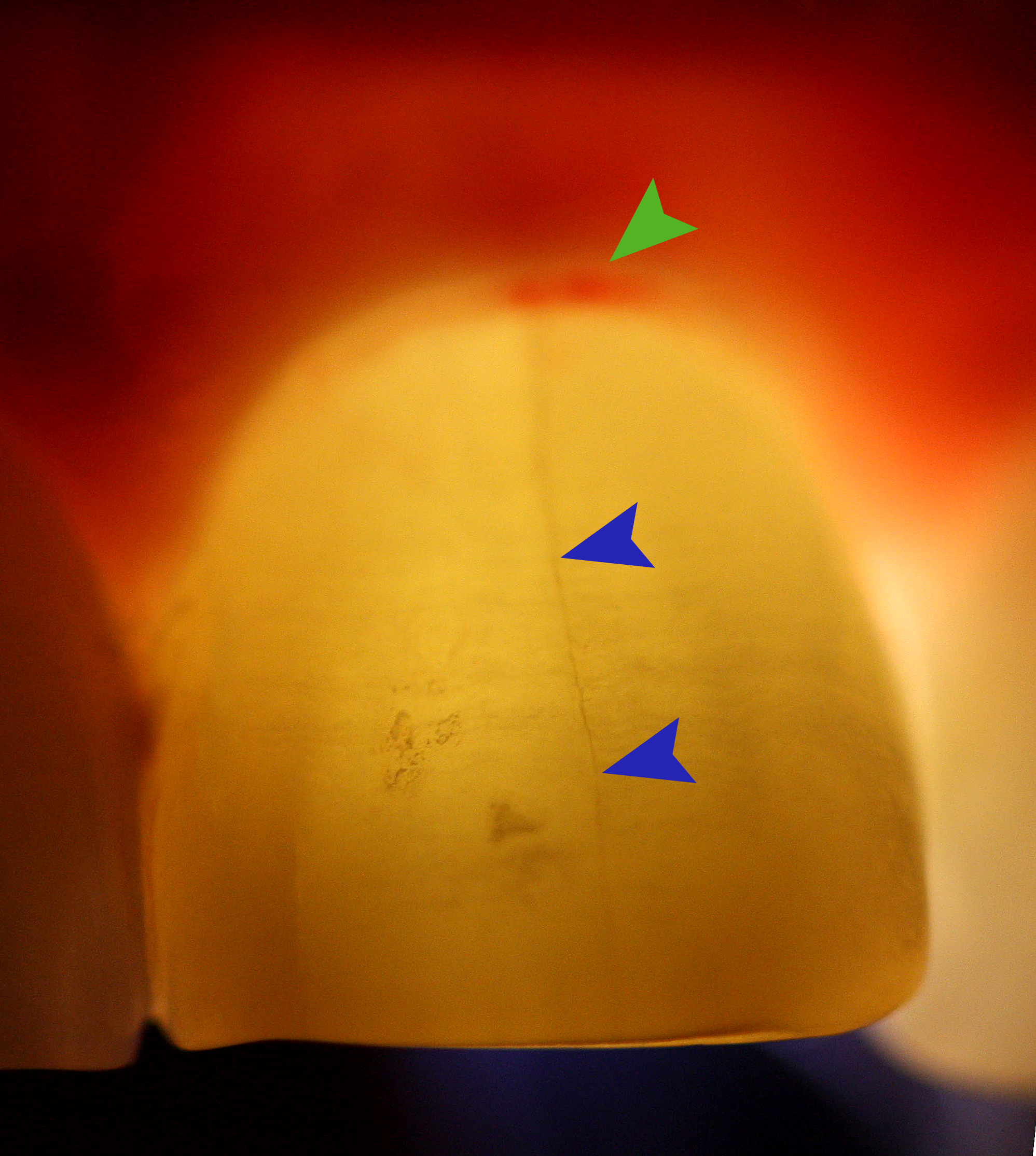
Transillumination demonstrating fracture

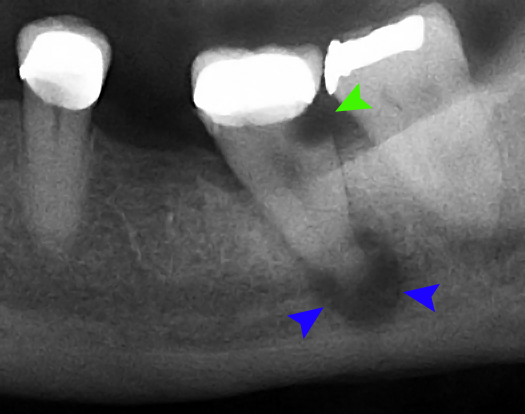
Decay (green) with apical abscess (blue)

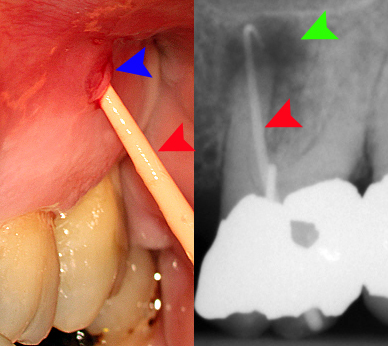
Gutta-percha point indicating abscess origin

Establishing a diagnosis of nondental toothache is initially done by careful questioning about the site, nature, aggravating and relieving factors, and referral of the pain, then ruling out any dental causes. There are no specific treatments for nondental pain (each treatment is directed at the cause of the pain, rather than the toothache itself), but a dentist can assist in offering potential sources of the pain and direct the patient to appropriate care. The most critical nondental source is the radiation of angina pectoris into the lower teeth and the potential need for urgent cardiac care.

=== Differential diagnoses ===
Parameter	Dentin hypersensitivity	Reversible pulpitis	Irreversible pulpitis	Pulp necrosis	Apical periodontitis	Periodontal abscess	Pericoronitis	Myofascial pain	Maxillary sinusitis
Site	Poorly localized	Poorly localized	Variable; localized or diffuse	No pain	Well localized	Usually well localized	Well localized, associated with partially impacted tooth	Diffuse, often over many muscles	Back teeth top jaw
Onset	Gradual	Variable	Variable	From pain of reversible pulpitis to no pain in days	Gradual, typically follows weeks of thermal pain in tooth	Sudden, no episode of thermal sensitivity	Sudden	Very slow; weeks to months	Sudden
Character	Sharp, quickly reversible	Sharp, shooting	Dull, continuous pain. Can also be sharp	No pain	Dull, continuous throbbing pain	Dull, continuous throbbing pain	Sharp, with continuous dull	Dull, aching	Dull, aching, occasional thermal sensitivity in back top teeth
Radiation	Does not cross midline	Does not cross midline	Does not cross midline	N/A	Does not cross midline	Little, well localized	Moderate, into jaw/neck	Extensive, neck/temple	Moderate, into other facial sinus areas
Associated symptoms	Patient may complain of receding gums and/or toothbrush abrasion cavities	Can follow restorative dental work or trauma	Follows period of pain that does not linger	Follows period of spontaneous pain	Tooth may feel raised in socket	May follow report of something getting "stuck" in gum	Tooth eruption ("cutting") or impacted tooth	Tension headaches, neck pain, periods of stress or episode of mouth open for long period	Symptoms of URTI
Time pattern	Hypersensitivity as long as stimulus is applied; often worse in cold weather	Pain as long as stimulus is applied	Lingering pain to hot or cold or spontaneous pain	Absence of pain following days or weeks of intense, well localized pain	Pain on biting following constant dull, aching pain development	Dull ache with acute increase in pain when tooth is moved, minimal thermal sensitivity	Constant dull ache without stimulus	Spontaneous, worse with eating, chewing, or movement of jaw	Spontaneous, worse when head is tipped forward
Exacerbating and relieving factors	Exacerbating: thermal, particularly cold	Exacerbating: thermal, sweet	Simple analgesics have little effect	Prolonged heat may elicit pain	Same as irreversible pulpitis, or no response to cold, lingering pain to hot, pain with biting or lying down	Tapping tooth makes worse, cleansing area may improve pain	Cleansing area can improve pain	Rest or ice makes pain better, movement and chewing make it worse	Tilting head forward, jarring movements (jumping) make pain worse
Severity	Less severe than pulpitis	Severe, for short periods	Variable; pain dissipates until periapical tissue affected	Severe	Severe	Severe	Mild to severe	Mild to moderate	Mild to severe
Effect on sleep	None	None usually	Disrupts sleep	None	Disrupts sleep	Variable, can disrupt sleep	If moderate to severe, will disrupt	Unusual	Unusual

When it becomes extremely painful and decayed the tooth may be known as a hot tooth.

== Prevention ==
Since most toothache is the result of plaque-related diseases, such as tooth decay and periodontal disease, the majority of cases could be prevented by avoidance of a cariogenic diet and maintenance of good oral hygiene. That is, reduction in the number times that refined sugars are consumed per day and brushing the teeth twice a day with fluoride toothpaste and interdental cleaning. Regular visits to a dentist also increases the likelihood that problems are detected early and averted before toothache occurs. Dental trauma could also be significantly reduced by routine use of mouthguards in contact sports.

== Management ==
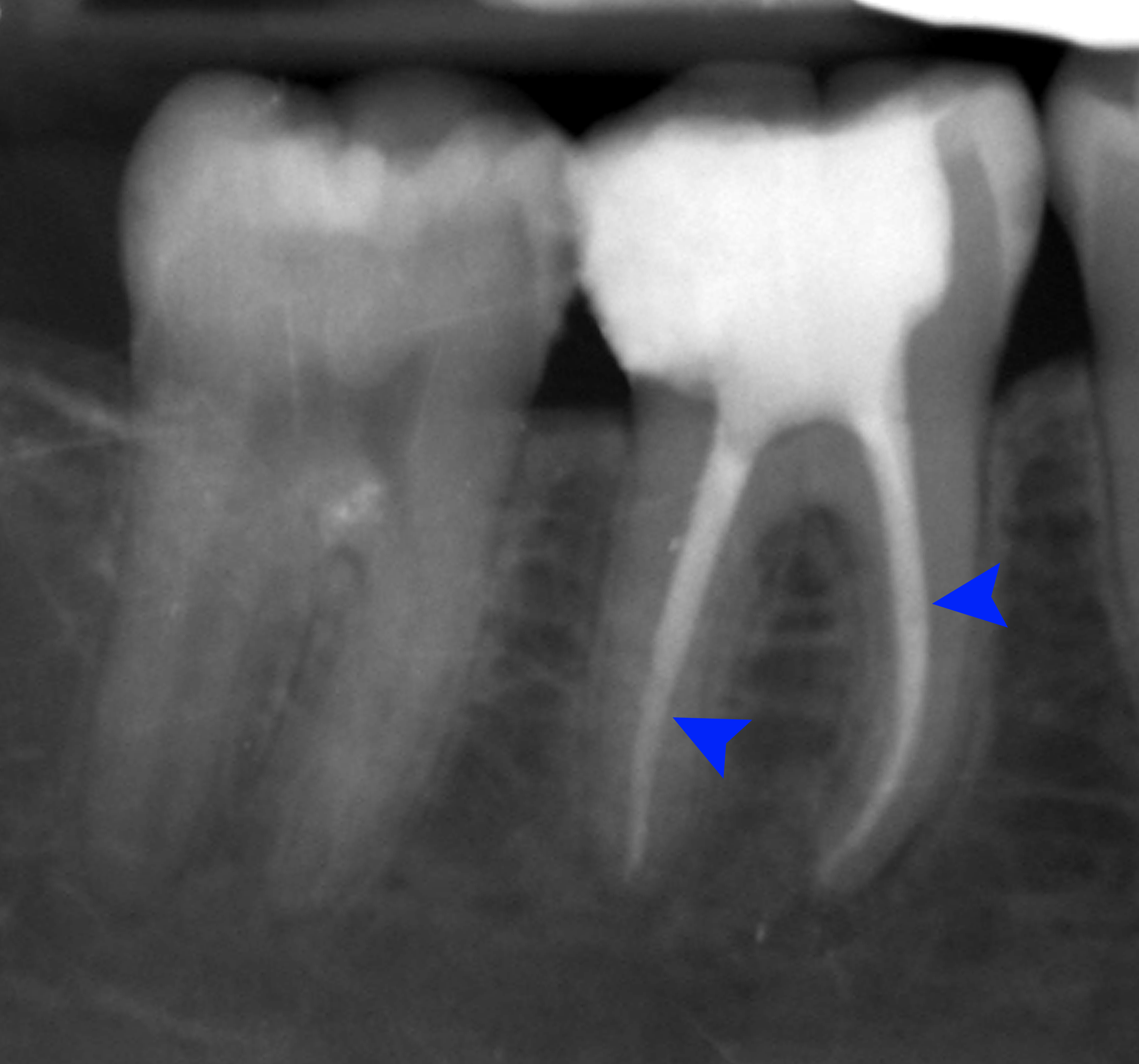
Root canal treatment (blue arrows) carried out on the lower right first molar with temporary restoration in place

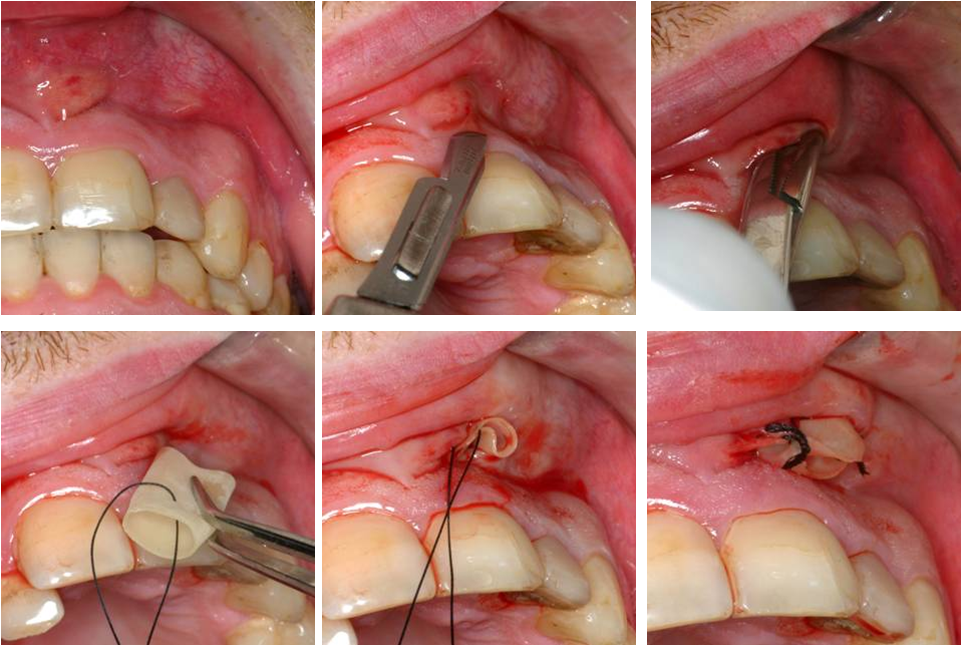
Incision of an abscess above a front tooth and insertion of a surgical drain

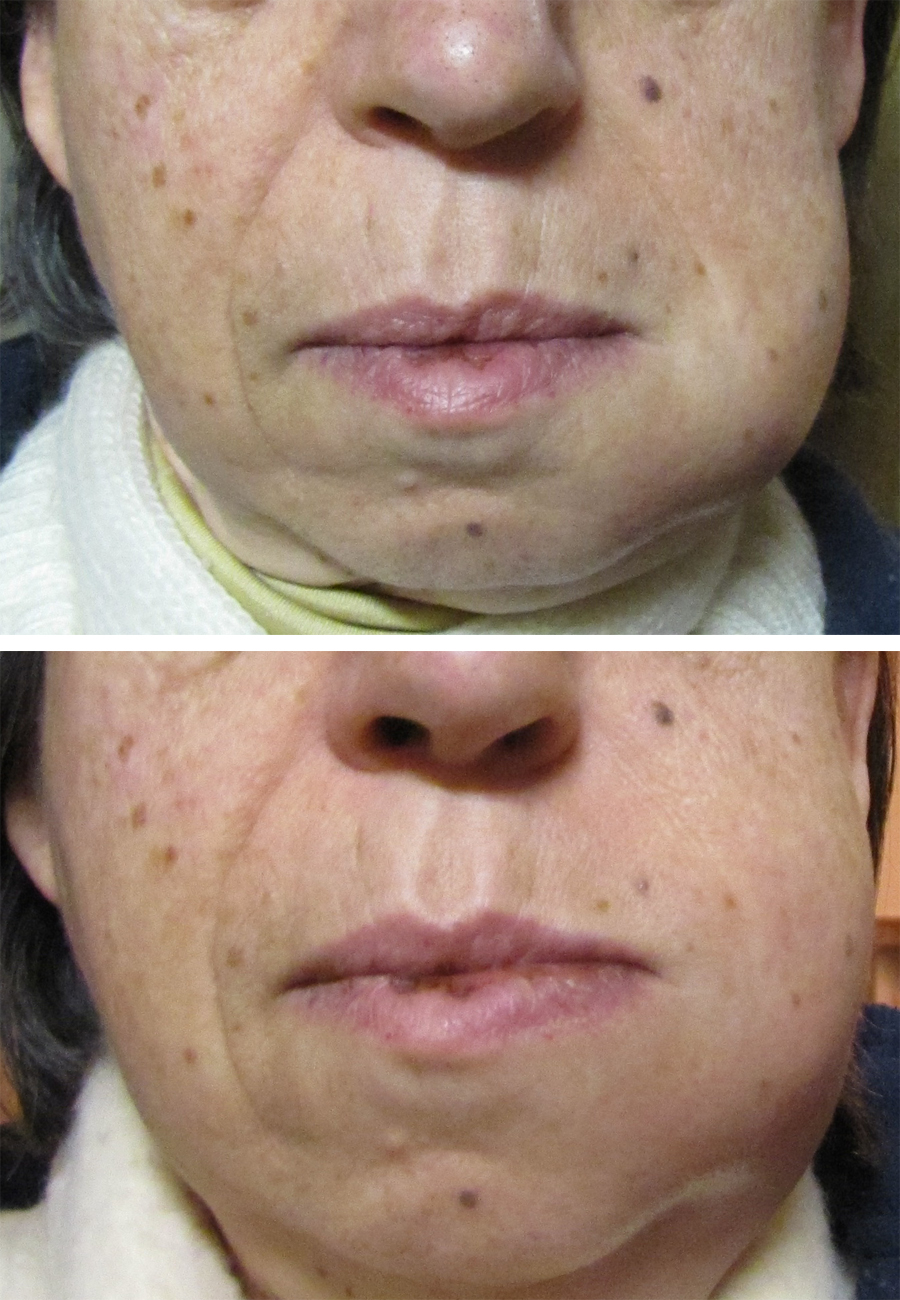
Odontogenic infection involving the buccal space. Above, deformation of the cheek on the second day. Below, deformation on the third day.

There are many causes of toothache and its diagnosis is a specialist topic, meaning that attendance at a dentist is usually required. Since many cases of toothache are inflammatory in nature, over the counter non-steroidal anti-inflammatory drugs (NSAIDs) may help (unless contraindicated, such as with a peptic ulcer). Generally, NSAIDs are as effective as aspirin alone or in combination with codeine. However, simple analgesics may have little effect on some causes of toothache, and the severe pain can drive individuals to exceed the maximum dose. For example, when acetaminophen (paracetamol) is taken for toothache, an accidental overdose is more likely to occur when compared to people who are taking acetaminophen for other reasons. Another risk in persons with toothache is a painful chemical burn of the oral mucosa caused by holding a caustic substance such as aspirin tablets and toothache remedies containing eugenol (such as clove oil) against the gum. Although the logic of placing a tablet against the painful tooth is understandable, an aspirin tablet can cause chemical burns when held against teeth and gums. Caustic toothache remedies require careful application to the tooth only, without coming into excessive contact with the soft tissues of the mouth.

For the dentist, the goal of treatment generally is to relieve the pain, and wherever possible to preserve or restore function. The treatment depends on the cause of the toothache, and frequently a clinical decision regarding the current state and long-term prognosis of the affected tooth, as well as the individual's wishes and ability to cope with dental treatment, will influence the treatment choice. Often, administration of an intra-oral local anesthetic such as lidocaine and epinephrine is indicated in order to carry out pain-free treatment. Treatment may range from simple advice, removal of dental decay with a dental drill and subsequent placement of a filling, to root canal treatment, tooth extraction, or debridement.

=== Pulpitis and its sequalae ===
In pulpitis, an important distinction in regard to treatment is whether the inflammation is reversible or irreversible. Treatment of reversible pulpitis is by removing or correcting the causative factor. Usually, the decay is removed, and a sedative dressing is used to encourage the pulp to return to a state of health, either as a base underneath a permanent filling or as a temporary filling intended to last for a period while the tooth is observed to see if pulpitis resolves. Irreversible pulpitis and its sequalae pulp necrosis and apical periodontitis require treatment with root canal therapy or tooth extraction, as the pulp acts as a nidus of infection, which will lead to a chronic infection if not removed. Generally, there is no difference in outcomes between whether the root canal treatment is completed in one or multiple appointments. The field of regenerative endodontics is now developing ways to clean the pulp chamber and regenerate the soft and hard tissues to either regrow or simulate pulp structure. This has proved especially helpful in children where the tooth root has not yet finished developing and root canal treatments have lower success rates.

Reversible/irreversible pulpitis is a distinct concept from whether the tooth is restorable or unrestorable, e.g. a tooth may only have reversible pulpitis, but has been structurally weakened by decay or trauma to the point that it is impossible to restore the tooth in the long term.

=== Dental abscesses ===
A general principle concerning dental abscesses is ubi pus, ibi evacua ("where there is pus, drain it"), which applies to any case where there is a collection of pus in the tissues (such as a periodontal abscess, pericoronal abscess, or apical abscess). The pus within the abscess is under pressure, and the surrounding tissues are deformed and stretched to accommodate the swelling. This leads to a sensation of throbbing (often in time with the pulse) and constant pain. Pus may be evacuated via the tooth by drilling into the pulp chamber (an endodontic access cavity). Such a treatment is sometimes termed open drainage. Drainage can also be performed via the tooth socket, once the causative tooth is extracted. If neither of those measures succeeds, or they are impossible, incision and drainage may be required, in which a small incision is made in the soft tissues directly over the abscess at the most dependent point. A surgical instrument such as a pair of tweezers is gently inserted into the incision and opened, while the abscess is massaged to encourage the pus to drain out. Usually, the reduction in pain when the pus drains is immediate and marked as the built up pressure is relieved. If the pus drains into the mouth, there is usually a bad or offensive taste.

=== Antibiotics ===
Antibiotics tend to be extensively used for emergency dental problems. As samples for microbiologic culture and sensitivity are hardly ever carried out in general dental practice, broad-spectrum antibiotics such as amoxicillin are typically used for a short course of about three to seven days. Antibiotics are seen as a "quick fix" by both dentists, who generally only have a very short time to manage dental emergencies, and by patients, who tend to want to avoid treatments (such as tooth extraction) which are perceived negatively. However, antibiotics typically only temporarily suppress an infection, and the need for definitive treatment is only postponed for an unpredictable length of time. An estimated 10% of all antibiotic prescriptions are made by dentists, a major factor in antibiotic resistance. They are often used inappropriately, in conditions for which they are ineffective, or their risks outweigh the benefits, such as irreversible pulpitis, apical abscess, dry socket, or mild pericoronitis. However, the reality is that antibiotics are rarely needed, and they should be used restrictively in dentistry. Local measures such as incision and drainage, and removal of the cause of the infection (such as a necrotic tooth pulp) have a greater therapeutic benefit and are much more important. If abscess drainage has been achieved, antibiotics are not usually necessary.

Antibiotics tend to be used when local measures cannot be carried out immediately. In this role, antibiotics suppress the infection until local measures can be carried out. Severe trismus may occur in when the muscles of mastication are involved in an odontogenic infection, making any surgical treatment impossible. Immunocompromised individuals are less able to fight off infections, and antibiotics are usually given. Evidence of systemic involvement (such as a fever higher than 38.5 °C, cervical lymphadenopathy, or malaise) also indicates antibiotic therapy, as do rapidly spreading infections, cellulitis, or severe pericoronitis. Drooling and difficulty swallowing are signs that the airway may be threatened, and may precede difficulty in breathing. Ludwig's angina and cavernous sinus thrombosis are rare but serious complications of odontogenic infections. Severe infections tend to be managed in hospital.

== Prognosis ==
Most dental pain can be treated with routine dentistry. In rare cases, toothache can be a symptom representing a life-threatening condition, such as a deep neck infection (compression of the airway by a spreading odontogenic infection) or something more remote like a heart attack.

Dental caries, if left untreated, follows a predictable natural history as it nears the pulp of the tooth. First it causes reversible pulpitis, which transitions to irreversible pulpitis, then to necrosis, then to necrosis with periapical periodontitis and, finally, to necrosis with periapical abscess. Reversible pulpitis can be stopped by removal of the cavity and the placement of a sedative dressing of any part of the cavity that is near the pulp chamber. Irreversible pulpitis and pulp necrosis are treated with either root canal therapy or extraction. Infection of the periapical tissue will generally resolve with the treatment of the pulp, unless it has expanded to cellulitis or a radicular cyst. The success rate of restorative treatment and sedative dressings in reversible pulpitis, depends on the extent of the disease, as well as several technical factors, such as the sedative agent used and whether a rubber dam was used. The success rate of root canal treatment also depends on the degree of disease (root canal therapy for irreversible pulpitis has a generally higher success rate than necrosis with periapical abscess) and many other technical factors.

== Epidemiology ==
In the United States, an estimated 12% of people reported that they had a toothache at some point in the six months before questioning. Individuals aged 18–34 reported much higher rates toothache than those aged 75 or over. In a survey of Australian schoolchildren, 12% had experienced toothache before the age of five, and 32% by the age of 12. Dental trauma is extremely common and tends to occur more often in children than adults.

Toothache may occur at any age, in any gender and in any geographic region. Diagnosing and relieving toothache is considered one of the main responsibilities of dentists. Irreversible pulpitis is thought to be the most common reason that people seek emergency dental treatment. Since dental caries associated with pulpitis is the most common cause, toothache is more common in populations that are at higher risk of dental caries. The prevalence of caries in a population is dependent upon factors such as diet (refined sugars), socioeconomic status, and exposure to fluoride (such as areas without water fluoridation).

== History, society and culture ==
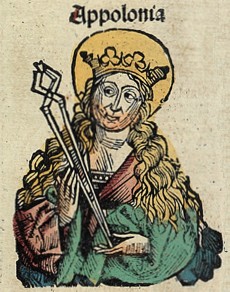
Saint Apollonia, patron saint for toothaches, holds one of her own extracted teeth in a pair of forceps (Nuremberg Chronicle, Hartmann Schedel, 1493)

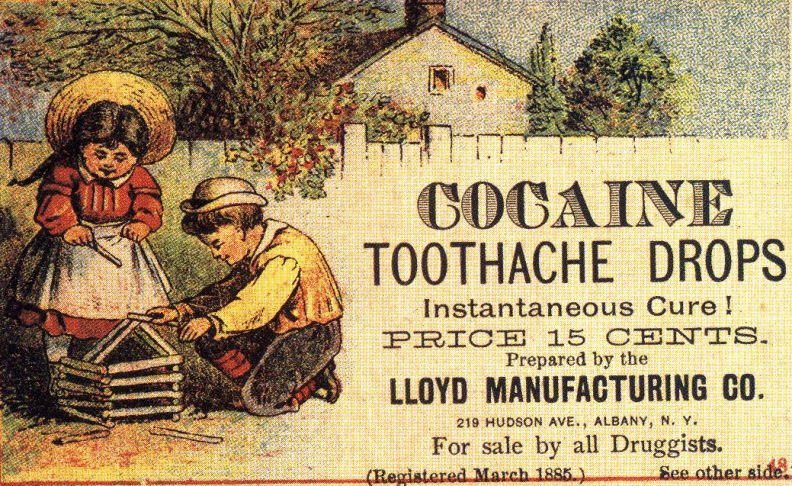
American advertisement from 1885 offering "instantaneous cure" for toothache with "Cocaine toothache drops". Cocaine was the first local anesthetic, but its addictive and other dangerous side effects eventually led to its use being virtually abandoned by modern health care.

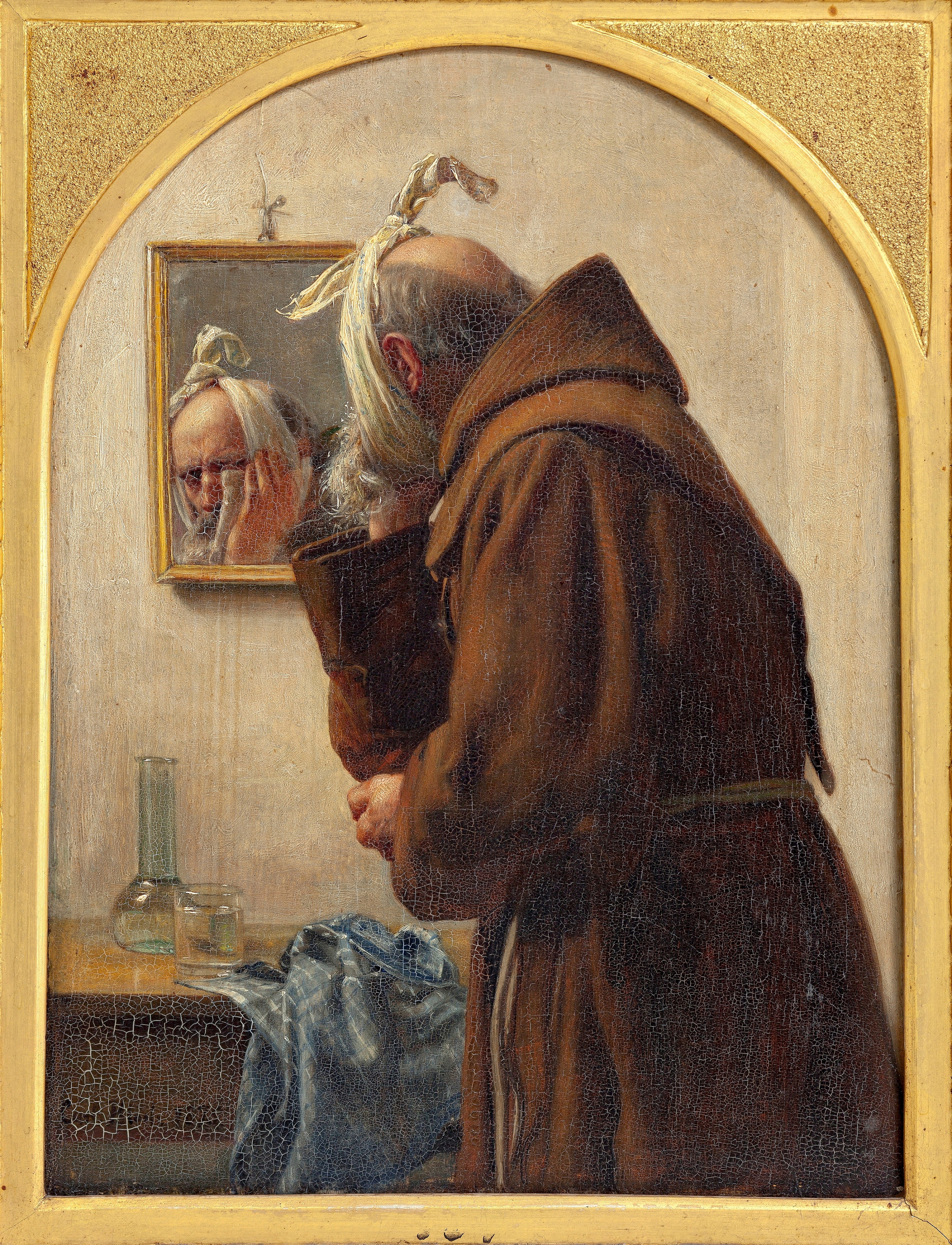
A monk with a toothache examines himself in a mirror, painting by Carl Bloch from 1875.

The first known mention of tooth decay and toothache occurs on a Sumerian clay tablet now referred to as the "Legend of the worm". It was written in cuneiform, recovered from the Euphrates valley, and dates from around 5000 BC. The belief that tooth decay and dental pain is caused by tooth worms is found in ancient India, Egypt, Japan, and China, and persists until the Age of Enlightenment. Although toothache is an ancient problem, it is thought that ancient people suffered less dental decay due to a lack of refined sugars in their diet. On the other hand, diets were frequently coarser, leading to more tooth wear. For example, hypotheses hold that ancient Egyptians had a lot of tooth wear due to desert sand blown on the wind mixing with the dough of their bread. The ancient Egyptians also wore amulets to prevent toothache. The Ebers papyrus (1500 BC) details a recipe to treat "gnawing of the blood in the tooth", which included fruit of the gebu plant, onion, cake, and dough, to be chewed for four days.

Archigenes of Apamea describes use of a mouthwash made by boiling gallnuts and hallicacabum in vinegar, and a mixture of roasted earthworms, spikenard ointment, and crushed spider eggs. Pliny advises toothache sufferers to ask a frog to take away the pain by moonlight. Claudius' physician Scribonius Largus recommends "fumigations made with the seeds of the hyoscyamus scattered on burning charcoal ... followed by rinsings of the mouth with hot water, in this way ... small worms are expelled."

In Christianity, Saint Apollonia is the patron saint of toothache and other dental problems. She was an early Christian martyr who was persecuted for her beliefs in Alexandria during the Imperial Roman age. A mob struck her repeatedly in the face until all her teeth were smashed. She was threatened with being burned alive unless she renounced Christianity, but she instead chose to throw herself onto the fire. Supposedly, toothache sufferers who invoke her name will find relief.

In the 15th century, priest-physician Andrew Boorde describes a "deworming technique" for the teeth: "And if it [toothache] do come by worms, make a candle of wax with Henbane seeds and light it and let the perfume of the candle enter into the tooth and gape over a dish of cold water and then you may take the worms out of the water and kill them on your nail."

Albucasis (Abu al-Qasim Khalaf ibn al-Abbas Al-Zahrawi) used cautery for toothache, inserting a red-hot needle into the pulp of the tooth. The medieval surgeon Guy de Chauliac used a camphor, sulfur, myrrh, and asafetida mixture to fill teeth and cure toothworm and toothache. French anatomist Ambroise Paré recommended: "Toothache is, of all others, the most atrocious pain that can torment a man, being followed by death. Erosion (i.e. dental decay) is the effect of an acute and acrid humour. To combat this, one must recourse to cauterization ... by means of cauterization ... one burns the nerve, thus rendering it incapable of again feeling or causing pain."

In the Elizabethan era, toothache was an ailment associated with lovers, as in Massinger and Fletcher's play The False One. Toothache also appears in a number of William Shakespeare's plays, such as Othello and Cymbeline. In Much Ado About Nothing, Act III scene 2, when asked by his companions why he is feeling sad, a character replies that he has toothache so as not to admit the truth that he is in love. There is reference to "toothworm" as the cause of toothache and to tooth extraction as a cure ("draw it"). In Act V, scene 1, another character remarks: "For there was never yet philosopher That could endure the toothache patiently." In modern parlance, this translates to the observation that philosophers are still human and feel pain, even though they claim they have transcended human suffering and misfortune. In effect, the character is rebuking his friend for trying to make him feel better with philosophical platitudes.

The Scottish poet, Robert Burns wrote "Address to the Toothache" in 1786, inspired after he suffered from it. The poem elaborates on the severity of toothache, describing it as the "hell o' a' diseases" (hell of all diseases).

A number of plants and trees include "toothache" in their common name. Prickly ash (Zanthoxylum americanum) is sometimes termed "toothache tree," and its bark, "toothache bark"; whilst Ctenium aromaticum is sometimes termed "toothache grass," and Acmella oleracea is called "toothache plant." Pellitory (Anacyclus pyrethrum) was traditionally used to relieve toothache.

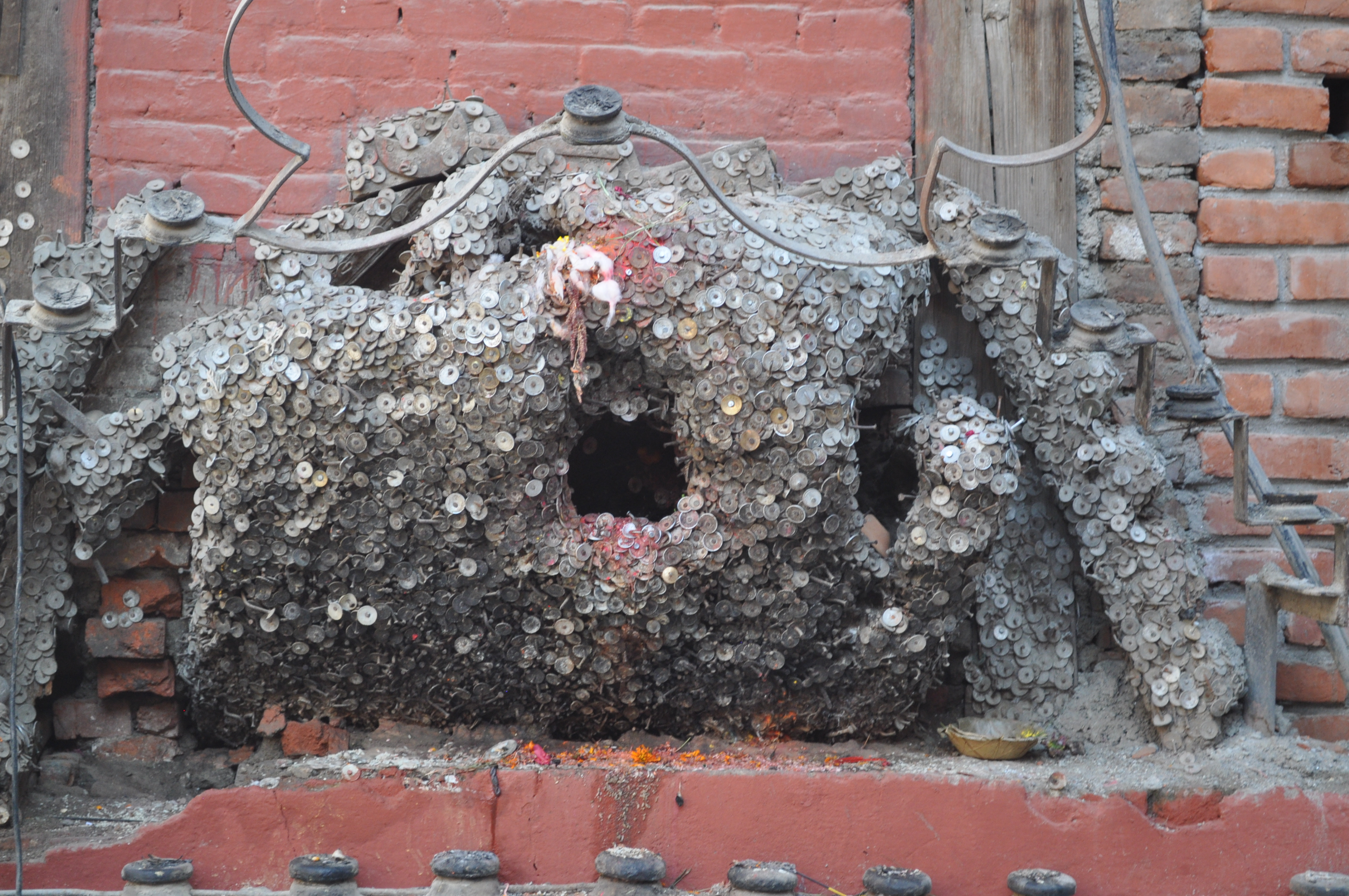
"toothache tree", Vaishya Dev shrine, Kathmandu, Nepal.

In Kathmandu, Nepal, there is a shrine to Vaishya Dev, the Newar god of toothache. The shrine consists of part of an old tree to which sufferers of toothache nail a rupee coin in order to ask the god to relieve their pain. The lump of wood is called the "toothache tree" and is said to have been cut from the legendary tree, Bangemudha. On this street, many traditional tooth pullers still work and many of the city's dentists have advertisements placed next to the tree.

The phrase toothache in the bones is sometimes used to describe the pain in certain types of diabetic neuropathy.
