= Articulating paper =

Diagnostic tool used in dentistry

Articulating paper is a diagnostic tool used in dentistry to highlight occlusal contacts and the distribution of occlusal forces. That is, it marks those points on the teeth where the teeth contact during biting and grinding. Articulating paper is made of a thin, non-adhesive paper strip covered in fluorescent ink or dye-containing wax. A strip of articulating paper is placed between the teeth while the desired mandibular movements are performed. Articulating paper is manufactured as "books" of many leaves which are torn out and used when required. These can be rectangular or dental-arch (horse shoe) shaped.

Example uses of articulating paper include:

- It is routinely used to check the occlusal surfaces of newly placed dental restorations, such as fillings or crowns; and dental prostheses, such as dentures or bridges.
- It is also used to highlight occlusal interferences, e.g. in persons with bruxism.
