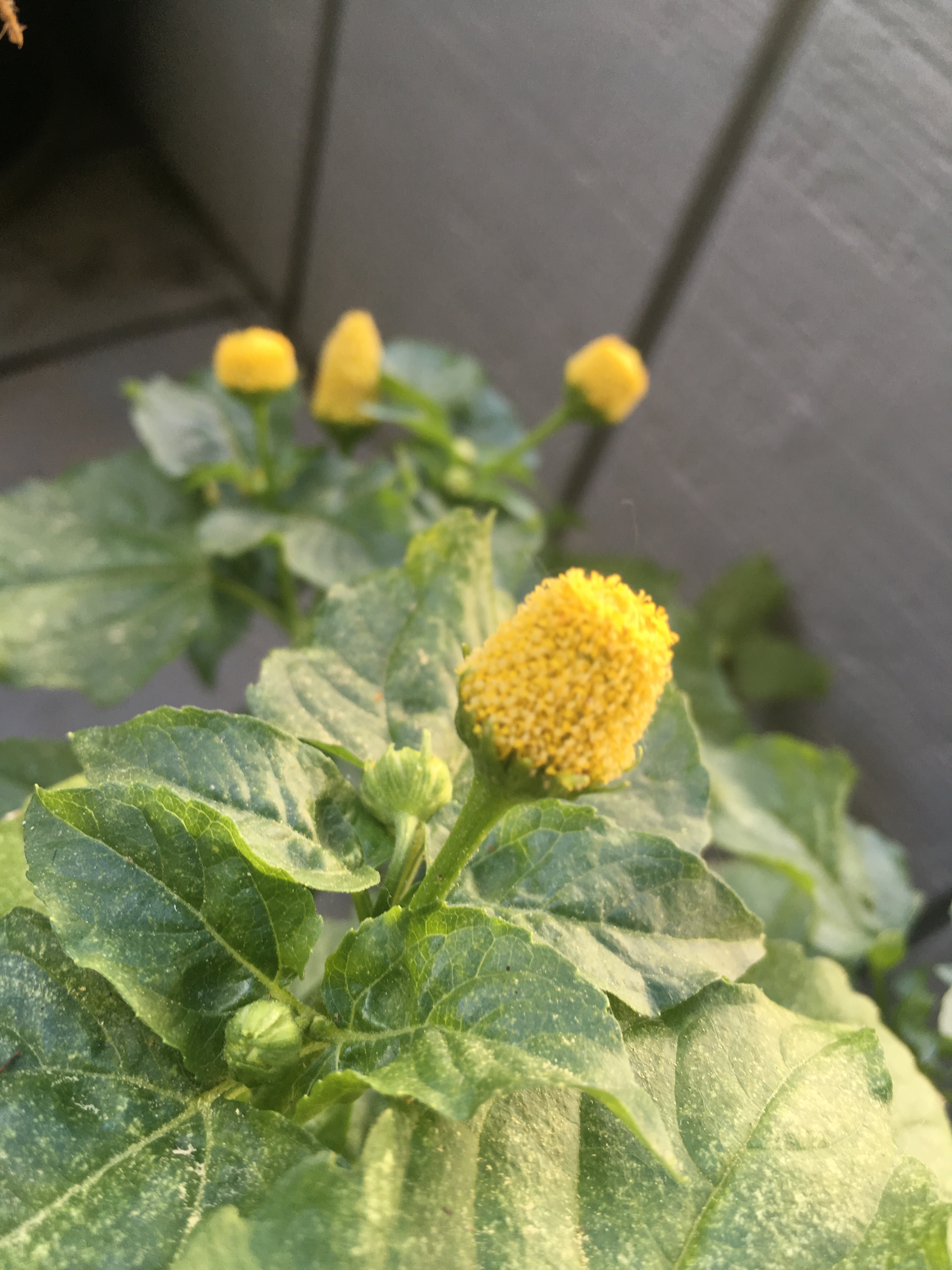
- Flowers and leaves of Acmella alba

Scientific classification
- Kingdom: Plantae
- Clade: Tracheophytes
- Clade: Angiosperms
- Clade: Eudicots
- Clade: Asterids
- Order: Asterales
- Family: Asteraceae
- Tribe: Heliantheae
- Genus: Acmella
- Species: A. alba

Binomial name
- Acmella alba (L'Hér.) R.K.Jansen

= Acmella alba =

Species of flowering plant

Acmella alba is a species of plant belonging to the family Asteraceae. Common names include brede mafane, spilanthes, tingflower, toothache plant, electric daisy, and buzz buttons. The flowers and leaves contain spilanthol, a local anesthetic.

== Distribution ==
A. alba is native to South America and southern Central America, and has been introduced to the island of Java.
