= Terminal bar =

Terminal bar or Terminal Bar may refer to:

- Terminal bar (histology), a histological term
- Terminal Bar (bar), a New York City bar that operated from 1958 to 1982
- Terminal Bar (book), a 2014 book about the bar of the same name
- Terminal Bar (film), a 2003 documentary film about the bar of the same name
- Terminal Bar (play), a 1986 play by Paul Selig
- The Terminal Bar, a 1982 novel by Larry Mitchell
