= Odontoblast process =

An odontoblast process, also referred to as Tomes's fiber, is a long, slender cytoplasmic extension of an odontoblast that occupies the dentinal tubule. It plays a crucial role in the formation, maturation, and mineralization of dentin throughout the life of the tooth. These processes are essential for maintaining dentin structure and integrity, as well as for mediating sensory transmission within dentin.

The odontoblast process extends from the dentinoenamel junction (DEJ) in the crown and from the dentinocemental junction (DCJ) in the root toward the outer wall of the dental pulp. This orientation reflects the centripetal pattern of dentin deposition, with odontoblasts lining the periphery of the pulp and their processes projecting outward through the dentin. The length and density of these processes vary depending on the region of the tooth, being longest in the crown and shorter toward the root apex.

During dentinogenesis, or dentin formation, odontoblasts differentiate from dental papilla cells and begin secreting the organic dentin matrix. As this process occurs, each odontoblast develops a cytoplasmic extension, known as the odontoblast process, which remains embedded within the forming dentin while the main cell body gradually migrates pulpward. This extension advances into predentin, an unmineralized, collagen-rich extracellular matrix that later undergoes mineralization to form mature dentin. The path created by the odontoblast process ultimately becomes the dentinal tubule, establishing a direct structural and functional link between the pulp and the dentin.

As the odontoblast process continues to elongate, it actively participates in dentin mineralization by secreting matrix vesicles and facilitating the deposition of hydroxyapatite crystals within the collagen framework. This mineralization process converts predentin into fully mineralized dentin, contributing to the hardness and resilience of the tooth. Additionally, the presence of odontoblast processes within dentinal tubules is believed to play a role in dentin sensitivity, as they are closely associated with fluid movement and neural elements in the pulp.

== Development ==
Odontoblasts differentiate from ectomesenchymal cells of the dental papilla under the inductive influence of the inner enamel epithelium during dentinogenesis. The formation of odontoblastic processes begins during the late bell stage of tooth development, coinciding with the onset of dentinogenesis. During differentiation, odontoblasts become highly polarized, with the nucleus positioned basally and the secretory end facing the future dentin, facilitating formation of the odontoblastic process. Each odontoblast typically gives rise to a single odontoblastic process that occupies an individual dentinal tubule. As odontoblasts begin secreting predentin and migrate toward the pulp, they leave behind a long cytoplasmic extension within the forming dentin matrix, known as the odontoblastic process.

During the secretion of unmineralized dentin matrix (predentin), odontoblasts develop elongated cytoplasmic processes that become embedded within the dentin as mineralization proceeds.

These odontoblastic processes determine the path and formation of dentinal tubules within dentin. In early dentinformation, odontoblastic processes may extend close to the dentinoenamel junction but tend to retract toward the pulpas dentin matures.

As dentin formation continues, odontoblasts retreat centripetally toward the pulp, while their cytoplasmic extensions remain trapped within the mineralized dentin. The course of these retained odontoblastic processes corresponds to the dentinal tubules extending from the pulp toward the dentinoenamel or dentinocemental junction.

== Distribution ==
The odontoblastic processes are distributed throughout the dentinal tubules of dentin.

The pattern of their distribution reflects the growth and shape of dentin as well as the migratory pathway of odontoblasts during tooth development.

=== From DEJ/DCJ to pulp ===
Odontoblastic processes extend from the peripheral dentin near the dentinoenamel junction or dentinocemental junction toward the pulp chamber, following the direction of dentin deposition.

==== Tubule density and shape ====
Dentinal tubules and their contained odontoblastic processes show regional variation in density, diameter, and curvature.

Near the dentinoenamel junction, tubules are more numerous, narrower, and frequently branched, often displaying a gentle S-shaped course due to crowding of odontoblasts during their inward migration. Closer to the pulp, dentinal tubules tend to be wider, less branched, and more closely packed, reflecting the convergence of odontoblasts toward the pulp chamber. Dentinal tubules are denser and more branched near the dentinoenamel junction than near the pulp, reflecting the crowding of odontoblasts during development.

=== Functional and regional variation ===
The extent and persistence of odontoblastic processes vary between different regions of the tooth and with age.

In certain regions, such as cusp tips, odontoblastic processes may extend closer to the dentinal surface, whereas in other areas they may retract toward the pulp over time.

== Relationship with dentinal tubules and dentin ==
=== Odontoblast processes located inside dentinal tubules ===
Odontoblast processes are specialized cytoplasmic extensions originating from odontoblast cells, which are primarily responsible for dentin formation. These processes are situated within dentinal tubules—microscopic channels that traverse the dentin layer of the tooth. Each odontoblast process projects from the cell body, located at the pulp-dentin border, and extends through the tubule toward the dentin-enamel junction (DEJ) or the dentin-cementum junction (DCJ).

Transmission electron microscopy (TEM) studies have revealed that dentinal tubules in the middle and outer regions of the dentin typically appear empty or are lined with electron-dense material, while those near the dentinoenamel junction often contain densely packed fine granular substances. During dentinogenesis, as odontoblast cell bodies recede toward the pulp, their processes remain embedded within the tubules. These extensions are most prominent and numerous in the inner dentin close to the pulp, gradually narrowing and decreasing in number as they extend toward the outer dentin.

Within the tubules, odontoblast processes are enclosed by a plasma membrane and supported by cytoskeletal filaments, which facilitate their dynamic and active nature. The spatial arrangement of these processes has physiological implications: higher concentrations of processes in the inner dentin contribute to increased dentinal sensitivity and enhanced fluid movement in this region, compared to the outer dentin closer to the enamel or cementum.

=== Role in tubule formation ===
During dentinogenesis, odontoblasts secrete predentin, an unmineralized organic matrix, and gradually withdraw their cell bodies toward the pulp as mineralization progresses. As this occurs, the matrix surrounding the odontoblast process becomes mineralized, forming the rigid walls of the dentinal tubule, while the process itself remains within the tubule's lumen. This developmental mechanism ensures that each dentinal tubule forms in direct relationship to an odontoblast process, with the tubule essentially molded around the extension.

=== Course of dentinal tubules and odontoblast migration ===
The path of dentinal tubules, particularly in the crown, is characteristically curved or S-shaped. This pattern mirrors the migration of odontoblasts during dentin formation; as odontoblasts retract toward the pulp while secreting predentin, they crowd together and move from the outer periphery of the dental papilla toward the pulp chamber's center. This coordinated movement results in the distinct sigmoid course observed in the tubules.

Odontoblast processes not only guide the initial formation of tubules but also serve as active sites of mineral deposition along the tubule walls. This highlights their essential role in both the structural organization and continued maintenance of dentin.

== Functional role ==
The odontoblast process plays an essential role in dentin formation, sensory perception, and maintenance of dentin vitality. Extending from the odontoblast cell body into the dentinal tubules, the process forms an integral part of the dentin-pulp complex.

=== Dentin formation (Dentinogenesis) ===
The odontoblast process is directly involved in dentinogenesis through its role in the secretion and mineralisation of the dentin matrix. As dentin is deposited, the process extends within the dentinal tubules, preserving the tubular architecture of dentin during primary and secondary dentin formation. In response to stimuli such as dental caries or trauma, odontoblast processes contribute to the formation of tertiary (reactionary) dentin as part of a protective response.

=== Sensory function ===
Odontoblast processes are closely associated with sensory nerve fibres within dentinal tubules and are implicated in dentin sensitivity. According to the hydrodynamic theory, external thermal, mechanical, or osmotic stimuli cause movement of fluid within dentinal tubules, which activates pulpal nerve endings and results in pain sensation. The odontoblast process has also been proposed to function as a mechanosensory cell capable of transmitting mechanical stimuli toward the pulp.

=== Transport and metabolic exchange ===
The odontoblast process facilitates the transport of nutrients, signalling molecules, and metabolic waste products between the dental pulp and mineralised dentin. This exchange is essential for maintaining dentin vitality, particularly in deep dentin where diffusion from the pulp is required.

=== Defensive and reparative role ===
In response to injury such as caries, tooth wear, or restorative procedures, odontoblast processes participate in defensive mechanisms by reducing dentin permeability and contributing to reparative dentin formation. These responses help protect the dental pulp from bacterial invasion and further tissue damage.

== Clinical and biological significance ==
=== Significance in tooth integrity and longevity ===
The health and longevity of a tooth is closely tied to the vitality of the odontoblast, namely, the odontoblast process.

The reason for this lies in the function of the odontoblast process in maintaining the patency of the dentinal tubules, as aging results in its obliteration, causing the occlusion of dentinal tubules. This results in diminished mechanical properties of the tooth such as the ability to withstand functional load and resisting fracture upon external forces.

=== Clinical relevance in dentin hypersensitivity ===
Even though the exact role of the odontoblast process in sensory transduction remains debated, the location of odontoblast processes within dentinal tubules places them at the frontline between external stimuli and pulpal response. They are the first one to be affected by caries, erosion and operative procedures. This unique biological position sets it as an early cellular stress signal, allowing it to be an initiator of pulpal response.

As mentioned earlier, odontoblasts are implicated to be associated with sensory nerve fibers, contributing to tooth sensitivity. This unique spatial relationship between the odontoblast process and nerve fibers are thus, stipulated to be contributors to sensory events like dentin hypersensitivity.

The odontoblast process was believed to function in sensory conduction in dentin, giving them vitality. This hypothesis explains the reason behind the pain and hypersensitivity experienced during cavity preparation and caries.

3 theories were proposed to understand the sensory role of the odontoblast process:

- direct innervation
- transduction theory
- hydrodynamic theory

The direct innervation theory states that the sensory nerve fibers from the pulp extend to the dentinoenamel junction but was later questioned due to the absence of nerve tissue histologically at the dentinoenamel junction (DEJ).

The transduction theory proposes that the odontoblast process acts as a mechanoreceptor which is able to conduct pain to nerve endings located at the peripheral pulp and dentinal tubules.

Nonetheless, the hydrodynamic theory remains the most widely accepted theory. First proposed by Brannstorm, the odontoblast process surrounded by dentinal fluid is said to be compressed upon exposure of dentinal tubules to osmotic, thermal, mechanical and chemical stimuli through the movement of the dentinal fluid. This results in the transduction of signals which are carried from the odontoblast process to the pulpal nerve sensory endings which induce pain / dentinal hypersensitivity.

Alternatively, the transmission of the pain signals may arise from the movement of the dentinal fluid and odontoblast process within the dentinal tubule, making contact with the nerve endings in the inner dentin and adjacent pulp.

When the nerve endings are contacted, they are deformed (thus, acting as mechanoreceptors) and transmit impulse.

Studies show that cold stimuli induce the outward movement of the odontoblast process while hot stimuli causes the odontoblast process to move inward.

=== Significance in aging and pathological changes ===
In aged patients, the odontoblast layer - including its processes - undergoes senescence. Aggravated by repeated insults from caries, attrition, etc, these diminish the dentin production capacity, regenerative potential and alters its response to injury. Therefore, patients may experience different clinical presentations of dental conditions such as reduced pain or sensitivity due to the decrease in dentin permeability associated with tubule occlusion.

=== Implications in dental caries and pulpal response ===
Odontoblasts, with their processes embedded in dentin, are the first pulpal cells that encounter caries–related bacterial products diffusing through dentinal tubules.

Therefore, odontoblasts are suggested to play a crucial part in the tooth's innate immunity by detecting such bacterial products to initiate an immune response to prevent potential spread of infection. It is studied that the odontoblast process senses pathogen-associated molecular patterns (PAMPs) through specialised pattern recognition receptor(PRRs).

Bacterial DNA, widely recognised as PAMP, is characterised by a high content of unmethylated CpG motifs and has immunostimulatory effects.

Odontoblast process PRRs, namely, Toll-like Receptor (TLR)s (TLR1-6 and TLR9) that can detect ligands from bacteria ranging from triacetylated and diacetylated lipoproteins (via TKR1/TLR2), LPS (TLR4), viral dsRNA (via TLR3), flagelin (via TLR5), unmethylated CoG motif-containing DNA (TLR9) and fight various pathogens invading the tooth.

Upon detection of these pathogenic ligands, they up-regulate the expression of the particular PRR, production of several chemokines such as IL-6, IL-8 and the immunosuppressive cytokine IL-10 upon activation via TLR2.

Furthermore, the odontoblast process produces defensins (small, cationic, broad-spectrum, antimicrobial peptides) which form pore-like micropore structures on the membranes of bacteria, virus, parasites, fungi, thereby disrupting it and causing the rupture and leakage of its contents.

Most common & well studied defensins synthesised by the odontoblast process are the human-ß defensins (hBDs) -1, -2, -3 and -4 which vary in their expression depending on the pathogenic challenge.

A special characteristic of defensins, namely hBD-2, is studied to possibly induce wound healing by promoting the release of dentin sialophosphoprotein (DSPP), causing the differentiation of stem mesenchymal cells of the pulp into odontoblast.

In addition, the odontoblast process produces an antibacterial agent known as nitric oxide (NO), which is a highly diffusible free radical produced by NO synthases (NOSs) that are capable of reducing Streptococcus mutans growth when released extracellularly.

Before the cariogenic challenge itself, the dentine matrix already had bioactive materials and growth factors (such as TGF-1, TGF-3, BMP-7, DMP-1, SDF-1) integrated into it due to its secretion by odontoblasts. During caries or application of pulp capping materials, the release of these bioactive materials and growth factors becomes crucial in the dentin's signalling reaction for regeneration.

=== Implications for operative and restorative dentistry ===
Dentin being exposed to iatrogenic damage during restorative procedures (eg., cavity and crown preparation) is said to undergo similar pathologic mechanisms as those undergone during cariogenic injury.

The generation of heat and the desiccation of the tissue can induce a tissue reaction similar to that occurring with caries, leading to intratubular and intertubular mineralisation which causes sclerotic dentin formation, followed by the formation of tertiary dentin. In deep cavities, failure to adhere to the minimal remaining dentinal thickness (RDT) of between 0.5 and 0.25mm resulted in higher rates of odontoblast death.

Eg. In deep cavities, ~50% odontoblast survival rate

Shallow cavities, >85% odontoblast survival rate (even though cutting of odontoblast process occurred)

Therefore, essentials to take note during a preparation of a tooth include,

- Minimising cavity preparation (but still following the necessary principles)
- Utilising sharp & appropriately sized burs used
- Using minimal pressure
- Providing appropriate cooling
- Avoiding excessive drying of dentin

Restorative materials such as tricalcium silicate cement (MTA, Biodentine) are positively-attributed in promoting odontogenic processes by stimulating odontoblast differentiation. Silicium ions promote increased metabolism, collagen synthesis, bone mineralisation and connective tissue cross-linking.

The dental bleaching procedure, where H2O2 and its by-products are released, can diffuse to the pulp via layers of enamel and dentine, leading to inflammation and sometimes, pulp necrosis.

== See also ==
- Tomes's process
- John Tomes
