= Dentin hypersensitivity =

Sharp, short-lived tooth pain

- Other names: Sensitive dentin, dentin sensitivity, cervical sensitivity, cervical hypersensitivity
- Specialty: Dentistry

Dentin hypersensitivity (DH, DHS) is dental pain which is sharp in character and of short duration, arising from exposed dentin surfaces in response to stimuli, typically thermal, evaporative, tactile, osmotic, chemical or electrical; and which cannot be ascribed to any other dental disease.

A degree of dentin sensitivity is normal, but pain is not usually experienced in everyday activities like drinking a cooled drink. Therefore, although the terms dentin sensitivity and sensitive dentin are used interchangeably to refer to dental hypersensitivity, the latter term is the more accurate.

== Signs and symptoms ==
The pain is sharp and sudden, in response to an external stimulus. The most common trigger is cold, with 75% of people with hypersensitivity reporting pain upon application of a cold stimulus. Other types of stimuli may also trigger pain in dentin hypersensitivity, including:

- Thermal – hot and cold drinks and foods, cold air, coolant water jet from a dental instrument.
- Electrical – electric pulp testers.
- Mechanical–tactile – dental probe during dental examination, periodontal scaling and root planing, toothbrushing.
- Osmotic – hypertonic solutions such as sugars.
- Evaporation – air blast from a dental instrument.
- Chemical – acids, e.g. dietary, gastric, acid etch during dental treatments.

The frequency and severity with which the pain occurs are variable.

== Causes ==
Cross section of a tooth. Non-dentin layer is covered by enamel or cementum and gingiva.

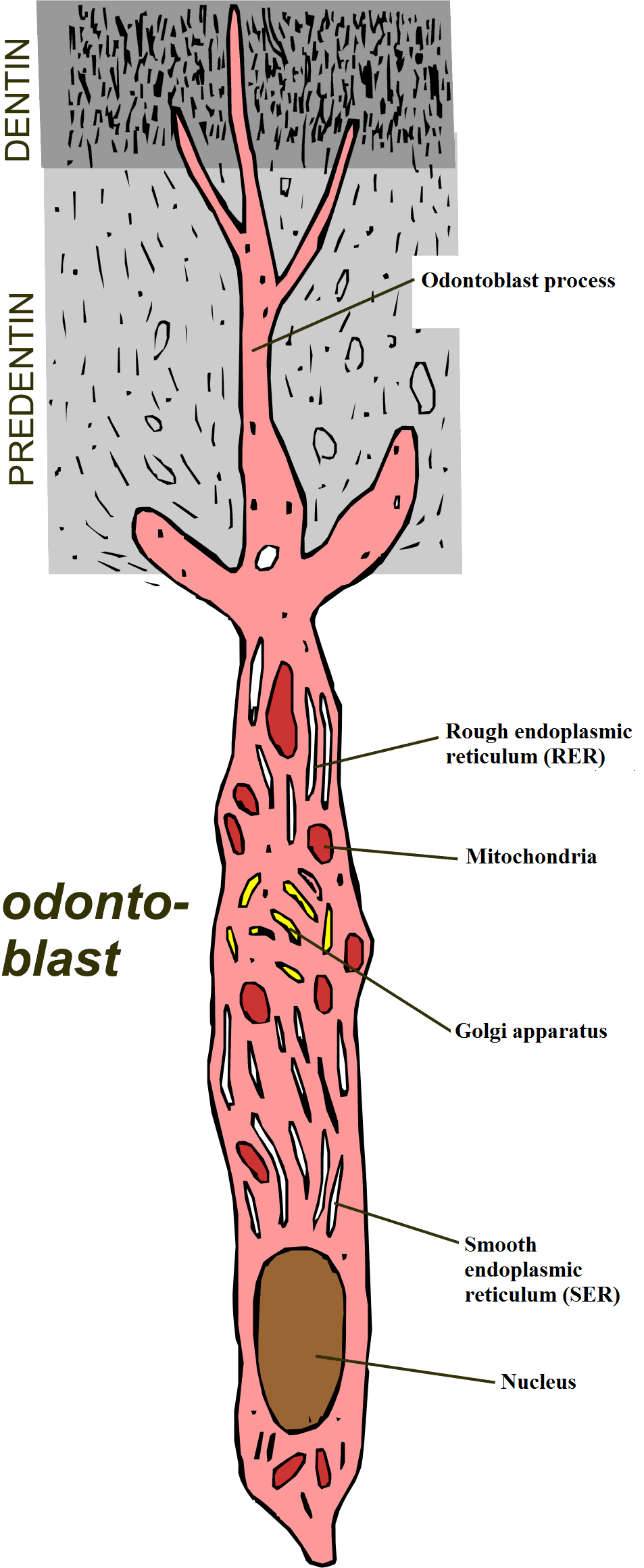
An odontoblast cell showing odontoblast process (not in proportion – in reality this process is far longer than the body of the cell).

The real cause of dentine hypersensitivity is controversial. There have been several theories put forward to try and explain the cause of dentine hypersensitivity. These include the odontoblastic transduction theory, the neural theory and the hydrodynamic theory.

The most commonly accepted model is called the hydrodynamic or fluid movement theory proposed by Brannstrom in 1964. According to this theory, when the exposed dentine surface is subjected to thermal, chemical, tactile or evaporative stimuli, the flow of the fluid within the tubules will be increased.

Fluid movement inside the dentinal tubules may be away from or towards the pulp. Dentine contains many thousands of microscopic tubular structures that radiate outwards from the pulp; these dentinal tubules are typically 0.5-2 micrometres in diameter. Changes in the flow of the plasma-like biological fluid present in the dentinal tubules can trigger mechanoreceptors present on nerves located at the pulpal aspect, thereby eliciting a pain response. This hydrodynamic flow can be increased by cold, (air pressure), drying, sugar, sour (dehydrating chemicals), or forces acting on to the tooth. Hot or cold food or drinks, and physical pressure are typical triggers in those individuals with teeth sensitivity. Movement of dentinal fluid away from the pulp can be caused by triggers such as cold and drying and movement towards the pulp can be caused by heat. Research has shown that triggers causing dentinal fluid to move away from the pulp elicit more of a painful response.

The odontoblastic transduction theory was suggested by Rapp et al. and puts forward the idea that odontoblasts act as receptor cells, and conduct impulses via synaptic junctions to the end of the nerves and therefore cause the feeling of pain. However, there is not much evidence to support this theory.

The neural theory proposes that thermal or mechanical stimuli can directly influence nerve endings within the dentinal tubules via direct communication with the nerve endings of the pulp.

There are two common ways in which dentine can be exposed; gingival recession and tooth wear. The main cause of DH is gingival recession (receding gums) with exposure of root surfaces, loss of the cementum layer and smear layer. Receding gums can be a sign of long-term trauma from excessive or forceful toothbrushing or abrasive toothpaste (dental abrasion), or a sign of chronic periodontitis (gum disease). A less common cause is acid erosion, which is the loss of hard dental tissues due to acids e.g. related to gastroesophageal reflux disease, bulimia or excessive consumption of acidic foods and drinks. Repeated exposures to a low pH cause the mineral content of the teeth on the outer layer of enamel to dissolve therefore leaving the dentine exposed and leading to hypersensitivity. Other causes include dental bleaching, smoking tobacco (which can lead to recession and therefore sensitivity) cracked teeth and abfraction or grinding of teeth. Evidence of abfraction may be shown by wedge shaped defects that are developed at the cervical region of the teeth known as abfraction lesions. There is no direct relationship between abfraction lesions and diet, periodontal disease or abrasion.

Most experts on this topic state that the pain of DH is in reality a normal, physiologic response of the nerves in a healthy, non-inflamed dental pulp in the situation where the insulating layers of gingiva and cementum have been lost; i.e., dentin hypersensitivity is not a true form of allodynia or hyperalgesia. To contradict this view, not all exposed dentin surfaces cause DH. Others suggest that due to the presence of patent dentinal tubules in areas of hypersensitive dentin, there may be increased irritation to the pulp, causing a degree of reversible inflammation.

== Diagnosis ==
The diagnosis of DH may be challenging. It is a diagnosis of exclusion, reached once all other possible explanations for the pain have been ruled out. A thorough patient history and clinical examination are required. The examination includes a pain provocation test by blasting air from a dental instrument onto the sensitive area, or gentle scratching with a dental probe. If a negative result for the pain provocation test occurs, no treatment for dentinal hypersensitivity is indicated and another diagnosis should be sought, such as other causes of orofacial pain.

Inflammation of the dental pulp, termed pulpitis, produces true hypersensitivity of the nerves in the dental pulp. Pulpitis is classified as irreversible when pulpal inflammation will irreversibly progress to pulpal necrosis due to compression of the venous microcirculation and tissue ischemia, and reversible when the pulp is still capable of returning to a healthy, non-inflamed state, although usually dental treatment is required for this. Irreversible pulpitis is readily distinguishable from DH. There is poorly localized, severe pain which is aggravated by thermal stimuli, and which continues after the stimulus is removed. There also is typically spontaneous pain without any stimulus. Reversible pulpitis may not be so readily distinguishable from DH, however usually there will be some obvious sign such as a carious cavity, crack, etc. which indicates pulpitis. In contrast to pulpitis, the pain of DH is short and sharp.

== Prevention ==
Gingival recession and cervical tooth wear are a few of the main causes of dentine hypersensitivity, as they lead to the exposure of dentinal tubules. This can be avoided by healthy dietary and oral hygiene practices. Using a non-traumatic toothbrushing technique (i.e. a recommended technique such as the modified Bass technique rather than indiscriminately brushing the teeth and gums in a rough scrubbing motion) will help prevent receding gums and tooth wear around the cervical margin of teeth. Non-abrasive fluoride-containing toothpastes should be used, at least twice daily for two minutes at a time. The consumption of acidic foods and drinks should be avoided if possible. Otherwise, it should be limited to mealtimes, and afterwards the mouth should be rinsed with still water. Importantly, the teeth should not be brushed immediately after acidic foods or drinks but ideally at least 30 minutes afterwards. It is recommended that anyone who suffers from acid reflux should seek medical treatment as to prevent their mouth being an acidic environment. A non-abrasive diet will also help to prevent tooth wear. Commonly, teeth whitening products can cause sensitivity. However, the increased sensitivity is temporary and should cease within a few days. If any sensitivity is experienced after using a tooth whitening product, taking a break may help.

== Treatment ==
There is no universally accepted, gold-standard treatment which reliably relieves the pain of dental hypersensitivity in the long term, and consequently many treatments have been suggested which have varying degrees of efficacy when scientifically studied. Generally, they can be divided into in-office (i.e. intended to be applied by a dentist or dental therapist), or treatments which can be carried out at home, available over-the-counter or by prescription. OTC products are more suited for generalized, mild to moderate dentin hypersensitivity associated with several teeth, and in-office treatments for localized, severe DH associated with one or two teeth. Non-invasive, simple treatments which can be carried out at home should be attempted before in-office procedures are carried out.

The purported mechanism of action of these treatments is either occlusion of dentin tubules (e.g. resins, varnishes, toothpastes) or desensitization of nerve fibres/blocking the neural transmission (e.g. potassium chloride, potassium citrate, potassium nitrate).

=== Home treatment ===
At-home treatments include desensitizing toothpastes or dentifrices, potassium salts, mouthwashes and chewing gums.

A variety of toothpastes are marketed for dentin hypersensitivity, including compounds such as strontium chloride, strontium acetate, arginine, calcium carbonate, hydroxyapatite and calcium sodium phosphosilicate. Desensitizing chewing gums and mouthwashes are also marketed.

Potassium-containing toothpastes are common; however, the mechanism by which they may reduce hypersensitivity is unclear. Animal research has demonstrated that potassium ions placed in deep dentin cavities cause nerve depolarization and prevent re-polarization. It is not known if this effect would occur with the twice-daily, transient and small increase in potassium ions in saliva that brushing with potassium-containing toothpaste creates. In individuals with dentin hypersensitivity associated with exposed root surfaces, brushing twice daily with toothpaste containing 5% potassium nitrate for six to eight weeks reduces reported sensitivity to tactile, thermal and air blast stimuli. However, meta analysis reported that these individuals' subjective report of sensitivity did not significantly change after six to eight weeks of using the potassium nitrate toothpaste.

Desensitizing toothpastes containing potassium nitrate have been used since the 1980s while toothpastes with potassium chloride or potassium citrate have been available since at least 2000. It is speculated that potassium ions diffuse along the dentinal tubules to inactivate intradental nerves. However, as of 2000, this has not been confirmed in intact human teeth and the desensitizing mechanism of potassium-containing toothpastes remains uncertain. Since 2000, several trials have shown that potassium-containing toothpastes can be effective in reducing dentin hypersensitivity, although rinsing the mouth after brushing may reduce their efficacy.

Studies have found that mouthwashes containing potassium salts and fluorides can reduce dentine hypersensitivity. A randomized clinical trial published in 2018 found promising results in controlling and reducing hypersensitivity when potassium oxalate mouthrinse was used in conjugation with toothbrushing. As of 2006, no controlled study of the effects of chewing gum containing potassium chloride has been made, although it has been reported as significantly reducing dentine hypersensitivity.

Nano-hydroxyapatite (nano-HAp) is considered one of the most biocompatible and bioactive materials and has gained wide acceptance in dentistry in recent years. An increasing number of reports have shown that nano-hydroxyapatite shares characteristics with the natural building blocks of enamel having the potential, due to its particle size, to occlude exposed dentinal tubules helping to reduce hypersensitivity and enhancing teeth remineralization. For this reason, the number of toothpastes and mouthwashes that already incorporate nano-hydroxyapatite as a desensitizing agent is increasing.

Bioglass is used in some toothpaste formulations for the treatment of dentin hypersensitivity. BioMin is a bioactive glass composed of calcium fluorophosphosilicate and is intended to occlude dentinal tubules. A 2025 study investigated a magnetically guided bioglass-based nanomaterial that penetrated more than 300 μm into dentinal tissue and formed a seal within exposed dentinal tubules.

Treatments used for dentin hypersensitivity.
Intended mechanism of action	Example(s)
Nerve desensitization	Potassium nitrate
Protein precipitation	Glutaraldehyde Silver nitrate Zinc chloride Strontium chloride hexahydrate
Plugging dentinal tubules	Sodium fluoride Stannous fluoride Strontium chloride Silver diammine fluoride Potassium oxalate Calcium phosphate Calcium carbonate Bioactive glasses (SiO2–P2O5–CaO–Na2O)
Dentin adhesive sealers	Fluoride varnishes Oxalic acid and resin Glass ionomer cements Composites Dentin bonding agents
Lasers	Neodymium:yttrium aluminum garnet (Nd:YAG) laser Galium-aluminium-arsenide (GaAlAs) laser Erbium-yttrium aluminum garnet (Er:YAG) laser

=== In-clinic therapy ===
In-clinic treatments can include the placement of materials to seal dental tubules or the wearing of appliances at night if the cause of the sensitivity stems from night-time grinding.

Fissure sealants, resin, or glass ionomer materials can be placed over areas of the tooth causing particular sensitivity in order to penetrate the exposed tubules and seal them against the external environment. Duraphat varnish, which is a high concentration fluoride varnish, can be applied at regular intervals to reduce the severity of the symptoms of dentine hypersensitivity.

== Epidemiology ==
Dentin hypersensitivity is a relatively common condition. Due to differences in populations studied and methods of detection, the reported incidence ranges from 4-74%. Dentists may under-report dentin hypersensitivity due to difficulty in diagnosing and managing the condition. When questionnaires are used, the reported incidence is usually higher than when clinical examination is used. Overall, it is estimated to affect about 15% of the general population to some degree.

It can affect people of any age, although those aged 20–50 years are more likely to be affected. Females are slightly more likely to develop dentin hypersensitivity compared to males. The condition is most commonly associated with the maxillary and mandibular canine and bicuspid teeth on the facial (buccal) aspect, especially in areas of periodontal attachment loss.

Dentine hypersensitivity is commonly experienced by patients. Studies reveal prevalence rates can range from 3-98%. Prevalence is found to be higher in patient questionnaire studies, 74%, over diagnostic studies, 15-30%. Diagnostic studies are where patients are diagnosed on classical symptoms (rapid, sharp, short duration). This discrepancy in range can be explained by DH being underreported due to the difficulties patients face when describing symptoms. The scale of symptoms for DH are so variant, some patients are unable to eat ice cream or drink cold water, whereas for others, discomfort is episodic in nature. Episodic symptoms of DH is the likely reason why some patients fail to report the discomfort. Hence having a negative effect on the number of diagnoses. If a patient does not complain of the symptoms then no additional screening checks are in place for dentin hypersensitivity and often the diagnosis is missed. DH is seen as a diagnosis of exclusion.

Although DH affects all age groups, varying from 20–50 years, it most commonly peaks between 30–40 years. Females are more affected by DH. It can be said that this is due to females having diets high in erosive acids and diligent oral hygiene methods. Another contributing factor to this theory is that females attend the dentist on a more regular basis, discuss health problems more readily than males which can lead to some bias in the DH being more prevalent in females. Hence the findings from some studies that DH does not significantly affect females over males.

A large number of DH cases are linked to periodontal disease and follow as a result of periodontal treatment. Surgical and non-surgical periodontal treatment is said to have the same effect on DH. As part of the periodontitis disease process, recession and root exposure are prevalent. The aim of periodontal treatment is to reduce the inflammation that presents. Treatment strategies also lead to the removal of cementum, smear layer and exposure of dentinal tubules, furthermore causing DH for patients. Within the elderly generation periodontal disease is more prevalent however, DH is not a common diagnosis in the elderly. DH decreases during 40–50 years, a plausible explanation or this is the result of sclerosing of canals and formation of tertiary dentine.

DH can present on several teeth in the whole of the mouth, on teeth in one part of the mouth or on a single tooth. Premolars and canines tend to present with hypersensitivity more readily followed by molars5, this is true for upper and lower arches. Maxillary teeth are more commonly affected. Sites of teeth affected are cervical aspect buccal sites on teeth.

== Prognosis ==
Dentin hypersensitivity may affect individuals' quality of life. Over time, the dentin-pulp complex may adapt to the decreased insulation by laying down tertiary dentin, thereby increasing the thickness between the pulp and the exposed dentin surface and lessening the symptoms of hypersensitivity. Similar process such as formation of a smear layer (e.g. from toothbrushing) and dentin sclerosis. These physiologic repair mechanisms, which occur at a naturally slow pace, are likely to occur with or without any form of treatment.

== See also ==
- Remineralization of teeth
- The hydrodynamic theory
