= Hydrodynamic theory =

Hydrodynamic theory may refer to:

- Hydrodynamic theory (dentistry)
- Fluid dynamics, the theory of fluids in motion
