= Tomes's process =

Histological feature of ameloblasts

Tomes's processes (also called Tomes processes) are a histologic landmark identified on an ameloblast, cells involved in the production of tooth enamel. During the synthesis of enamel, the ameloblast moves away from the enamel, forming a projection surrounded by the developing enamel. Tomes's processes are those projections and give the ameloblast a "picket-fence" appearance under a microscope.

They are located on the secretory, basal, end of the ameloblast.

Terminal bar apparatuses connect the Tomes's processes. Tonofilaments separate the developing enamel from the enamel organ. Gap junctions synchronize cell activation.

The body of the cell between the processes first deposits enamel, which will become the periphery of the enamel prisms, then the Tomes's process will infill the main body of the enamel prism. More than one ameloblast contributes to a single prism.

Tomes's processes are distinctly different from Tomes's fibers, which are odontoblastic processes that occupy dentinal tubules.

== See also ==
- Tooth
- Tomes's fibers
- John Tomes
