= Hydrodynamic theory (dentistry) =

In dentistry, a theory for dentin hypersensitivity

- Biological system: Nervous system
- Health: Harmful
- Stimuli: Thermal (hot and cold), mechanical, osmotic, chemical, electrical
- Method: Stimuli exposure causes increased fluid flow in dentinal tubules
- Outcome: May cause dentine hypersensitivity
- Duration: Occurs in short, transient bursts

In dentistry, the hydrodynamic or fluid movement theory is one of three main theories developed to explain dentine hypersensitivity, which is a sharp, transient pain arising from stimuli exposure. It states that different types of stimuli act on exposed dentine, causing increased fluid flow through the dentinal tubules. In response to this movement, mechanoreceptors on the pulp nerves trigger the acute, temporary pain of dentine hypersensitivity.

The fluid flow mechanism behind hydrodynamic theory was first introduced by Alfred Gysi in 1900, and subsequently developed by Martin Brännström in the 1960s through a series of experimental studies. Further supporting evidence has since been collected from epidemiological surveys and experimental data comparing dentinal tubule numbers in hypersensitive and non-hypersensitive teeth.

Alternate theories include the “dentine innervation” and “odontoblast transduction” theories, both of which lack substantial supporting evidence. The hydrodynamic theory is currently the accepted explanation for dentine hypersensitivity, upon which several treatment and diagnostic strategies have been built by dental practitioners.

== Overview of theory ==
Dental erosion and loss of enamel increase the patency of dentinal tubules

The hydrodynamic theory proposes that when dentinal tubules are exposed at the pulp and dentine surface, external stimuli cause changes in fluid flow. Dentinal tubules may become exposed due to various reasons: e.g. dental erosion, enamel loss and periodontal diseases.

When exposed dentinal tubules are then subject to stimuli, the direction and rate of fluid flow movement within the tubules change. This causes shifts in pressure within the dentine, which stimulate the myelinated nerves located in the pulp, causing the sensation of pain. The main nerve fibres responsible for responding to the stimuli are mostly type A-beta (Aβ), which carry tactile information, and some A-delta (Aδ) nerves, which relay pain and temperature information to the brain.

Impact of various stimuli on fluid flow in dentine
Types of stimuli	Example(s)	Effect
Mechanical	Over-brushing, abrasions from sharp, dental instruments	Outward fluid flow, arising from compressed surface tissue
Cold thermal	Cold foods and liquids	Outward fluid flow
Heat thermal	Hot food and liquids	Inward fluid flow, caused by fluid contraction in tubules
Evaporative	Air blasts, windy weather	Outward fluid flow caused by fluid evaporation at surface of tubule
Osmotic	Sugar, acidic solutions	Outward fluid flow
Chemical	Cosmetic dental procedures e.g. teeth whitening	Outward fluid flow

== Origin and development ==
=== Alfred Gysi - 1900 ===
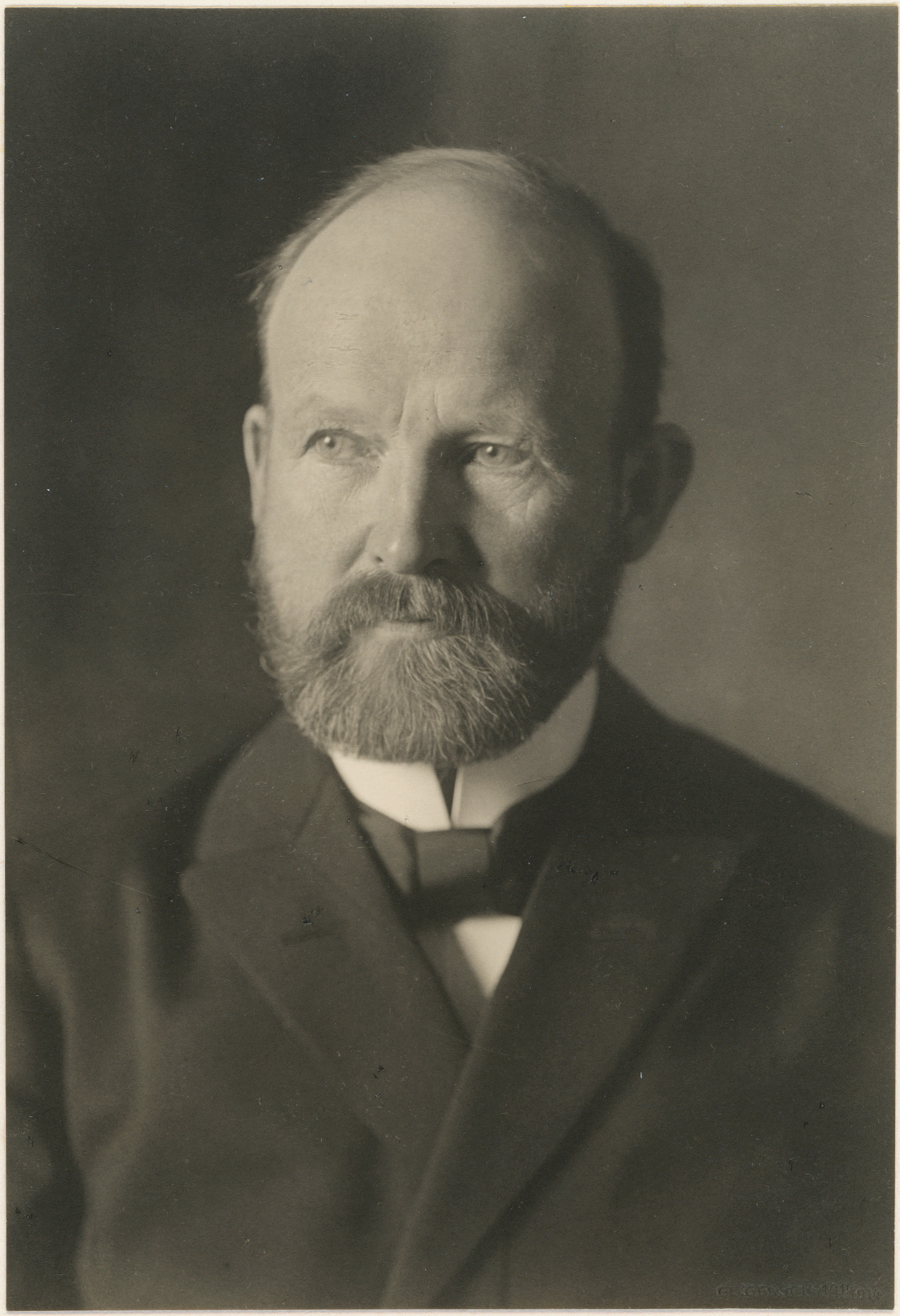
Portrait of Dr. Alfred Gysi taken in 1914, University of Zurich

Dr. Gysi (1865-1957) was a Swiss dentist who specialised in jaw movement and structure, as well as prosthodontics. He studied dentistry in Geneva, Switzerland and the Philadelphia Dental College, eventually becoming a dentistry professor at the University of Zurich. At the time, it was still believed that dentine hypersensitivity was caused by either nerve fibre stimulation within dentine or odontoblast processes acting as pain receptors.

In 1900, Gysi first introduced the concept of fluid-flow movement as an explanation for dentine hypersensitivity in his publication for the British Journal of Dental Science: An attempt to explain the sensitiveness of dentine. In his clinical practice, Gysi observed that the removal of fluid from the cavity floor of his patients' teeth produced the sharp, short pain of dentine hypersensitivity. He subsequently concluded that drying the cavity fluid caused an interruption in the fluid flow movement within the dentinal tubules. This led to Gysi's hypothesis that within the dentinal tubules, there was a natural outward flow of fluid. Physical and thermal forms of stimuli would cause an increase change in the direction of fluid flow, which activated the pulpal nerve endings.

=== Martin Brännström - 1960s ===
Dr.Brännström (1922-2001) was a Swedish dentist, specialising in Oral Pathology and the mechanism of tooth sensitivity. In the 1960s, Brännström provided evidence to support Gysi's hydrodynamic theory through a series of experimental studies in vitro to show that various stimuli caused shifts in fluid movement across dentine, producing pain. Brännström's 1965 experimental study indicated that hypersensitive dentine exhibited a higher number of exposed, patent tubules than non-sensitive dentine. This hypersensitivity was noticeably lessened when the tubules were then deliberately occluded to restrict fluid flow.

Brännström conducted trials using different stimuli. It was shown that various types of cold thermal, evaporative cooling, osmotic stimuli and hypertonic chemical substances could cause an increase in outward fluid flow along the dentinal tubules. Contrastingly, thermal hot stimuli caused an inward fluid flow. In vitro studies indicated that stimuli causing an outward flow of fluid from the dentine-pulp complex led to a greater intensity of dentine hypersensitivity than stimuli triggering inward flow. Brännström's multiple publications of both experimental and observational data provided significance evidence to support the theory of hydrodynamic mechanism causing dentine hypersensitivity.

== Supporting experiments ==
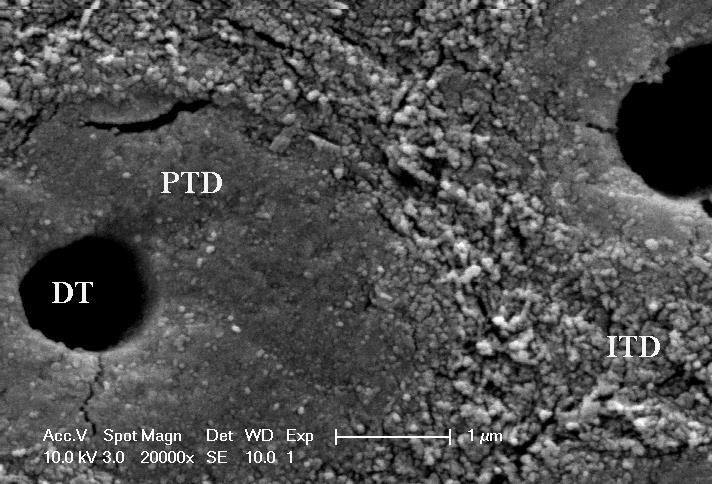
SEM image of dentine with exposed dentinal tubules (Daood et al. 2018; Electron Microscope Unit, Queen Mary Hospital, The University of Hong Kong)

Epidemiological surveys have shown that dentine hypersensitivity arises when the dentinal tubules are both exposed and patent. It was proposed that if the hydrodynamic fluid flow was responsible for hypersensitivity, then there must be higher numbers of dentinal tubules exposed at the surface of the root and patent to the dental pulp. A strong positive correlation has been identified between the levels of hypersensitivity in exposed dentine and the number and density of dentinal tubules.

=== The patency of dentinal tubules 1987 ===
In 1987, A study of the patency of dentinal tubules in sensitive and non-sensitive cervical dentine, was published in the Journal of Clinical Periodontology. This experiment was conducted by E.G. Absi, M. Addy and D.Adams from the Dental School of Cardiff University. It compared the patency of sensitive and non-sensitive cervical dentine and provided significant evidence to support the hydrodynamic theory.

The aim of the experiment was to investigate whether patients with dentine hypersensitivity would have higher numbers of dentinal tubules exposed at the surface of the root. There had been little evidence to support the theory prior to this experiment, with the exception of Brännström's in vitro studies. With the use of a scanning electron microscope and dye penetration technology, the findings concluded that the dentinal tubules were eight times greater in number and 2 times wider in diameter in dentine of “hypersensitive” classified patients than in non-hypersensitive dentin. The results supported the theory in that hypersensitive dentin had wider, more exposed dentinal tubules and provided evidence of stimuli transmission via a hydrodynamic movement along dentinal tubules.

=== Intradental nerves and the rate of fluid flow 2007 ===
In 2007, The relationship between the discharge of intradental nerves and the rate of fluid flow through dentine in the cat was published in the Archives of Oral Biology. The experiment was conducted by Noppakun Vongsavan and Bruce Matthews from the Department of Physiology at the University of Bristol.

The aim of the experiment was to investigate the impact of fluid flow movement on intradental nerves, to provide evidence for the hydrodynamic theory. Hydrostatic pressure stimuli were applied to exposed dentine in cats under anaesthetic. Recordings of the resulting nerve impulses were taken from the dentine and filaments located in the inferior alveolar nerve. The results showed that outward fluid flow produced a greater discharge of intradental nerves than inward fluid flow and were more likely to stimulate the pain receptors. This supports Brännström's findings that stimuli causing an outwards fluid flow (e.g. cold thermal), generate more hypersensitivity than stimuli for inward flow (e.g. heat thermal).

== Criticisms and alternative theories ==
=== Criticisms ===
Although there is sufficient evidence for a fluid flow mechanism within dentinal tubules, hydrodynamic theory is criticised for being unable to adequately explain the neurosensory mechanisms behind dentine hypersensitivity. It is uncertain how the physical changes in direction and rate of fluid flow within dentinal tubules actually causes the stimulation of pain receptors in pulp nerves.

Evidence against the theory was presented in an experiment in which dentinal tubules that had been purposely obstructed to prevent fluid flow still exhibited hypersensitivity upon the application of thermal stimuli. Additionally, it has been noted in clinical cases that hypersensitivity worsened even after dental cavities had significantly destroyed dentinal tubules and made fluid flow impossible.

It has since been suggested that the hydrodynamic theory may account for some, but not all types of stimuli. As a result, an addition to the theory has been proposed that the pain may be stimulated by the generation of an electric potential arising from the fluid flow movement. However, it is unclear whether the fluid movement is capable of generating sufficient hydrostatic pressure to electrically stimulate pain receptors.

=== Dentine innervation theory ===
The dentine innervation theory is based on the premise that dentine is innervated and that the stimulation of the nerve endings within dentinal tubules causes hypersensitivity. It states that damage to local dentinal tubules stimulates an action potential, which travels along the nerve to inner dentine. Initially, histological stain experimentation was carried out using silver to demonstrate the existence of nerve fibres in dentinal tubules. However, further experimentation indicated that although there were rare instances of nerve fibres in inner dentine, there was no indication of innervation within the actual tubules. Transmission electron microscopy and immune-histochemical analyses later indicated that areas of inner dentine up to the dentin-enamel junction may be innervated. However, there has been no evidence supporting the innervation of outer dentine, which is considered the main area of hypersensitivity.

=== Odontoblast transduction theory ===
The odontoblast transduction theory proposes that odontoblast processes act as pain receptors that conduct these stimuli impulses to the pulpal nerve endings of inner dentine. The theory arose from research that showed the odontoblast sending processes from the outer pulp layer to the dentin-enamel junction. Rapp & Avery published evidence supporting the existence of acetylcholinesterase on the dental odontoblast processes. As acetylcholinesterase is responsible for terminating neurotransmission and synapse signalling, they hypothesised that it helped conduct sensory information to the pulpal nerves from the odontoblast processes. However, there has been a lack of evidence that there are synapses between odontoblasts and the pulpal nerve endings, or that there exist neurotransmitter vesicles in odontoblast processes. Further criticism arose from clinical observations indicating that hypersensitivity continued even after the odontoblast layer was destructed by dental cavities and nerve injuries.

== Applications ==
Dental practitioners have applied the hydrodynamic theory to prevent and treat dentine hypersensitivity in patients. Brännström's studies on the impact of various stimuli on hypersensitivity have led to new techniques for diagnosis and management.

As mechanical stimuli have proven to be a major cause of hypersensitivity, preventative strategies include proper hygiene and brushing technique instruction. Patients have been advised to use non-abrasive toothpastes, select soft-bristle toothbrushes and avoid overstimulating the surface of dentine. To avoid increasing the patency of tubules, patients have been encouraged to schedule regular appointments to check for dental erosion, tooth decay and periodontal disease.

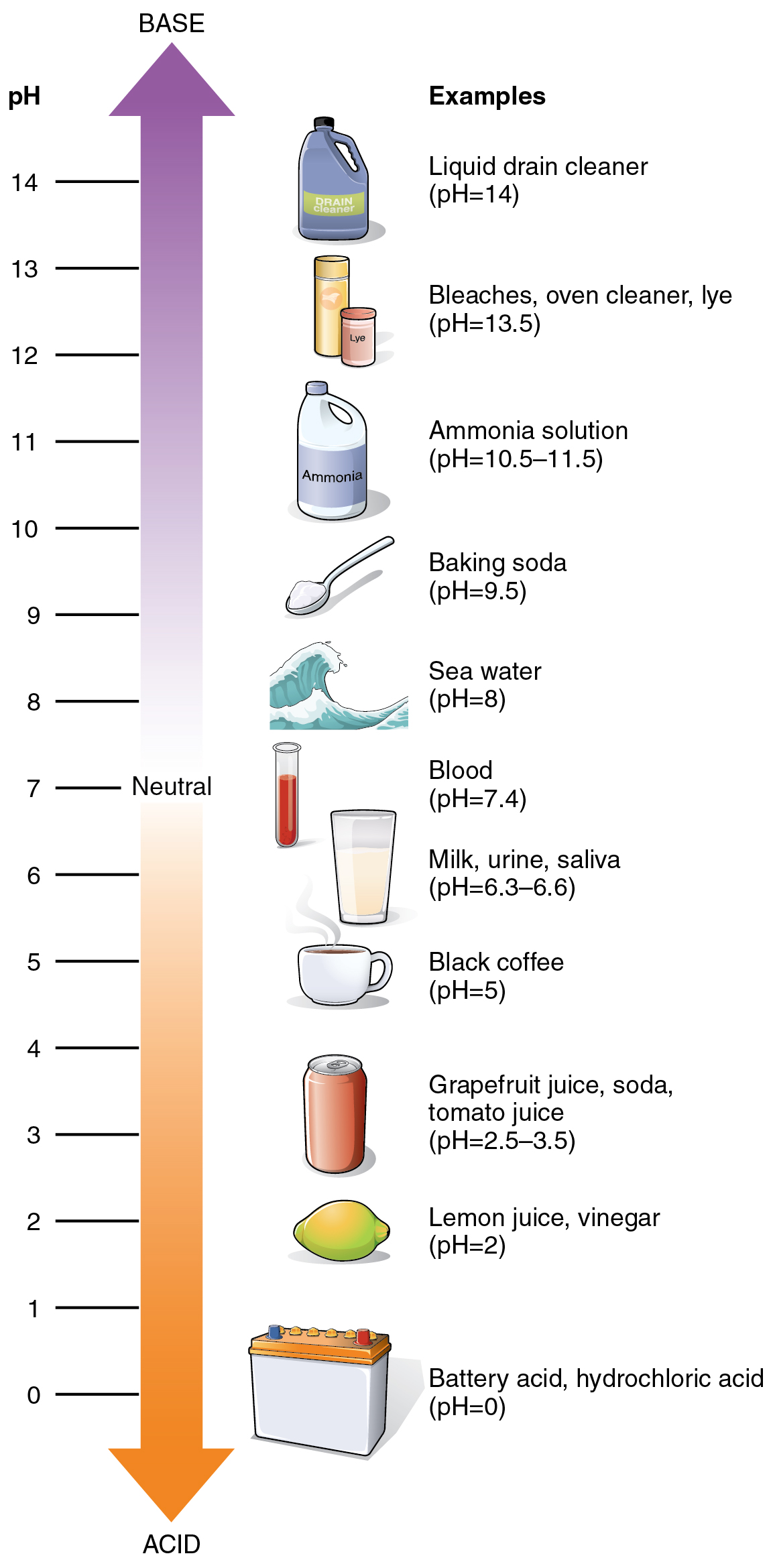
Consumption of acidic drinks e.g. vinegar, causes dental erosion, thus chemical stimulation

To avoid chemical stimulation and dental erosion, dental practitioners have prescribed reduced consumption of erosive agents and acids from soft drinks, fruit and vinegar. Certain chemicals have now been advised against for cosmetic procedures, such as teeth whitening.

Brännström's initial studies on hydrodynamic theory indicate that occlusion of the dentinal tubules reduces the severity of dentine hypersensitivity. This has led to several treatment methods to block or reduce the diameter of the tubules, either mechanically or chemically.

One notable non-invasive method is the depolarisation of the pupal nerve using a dentifrice with chemical treatments e.g. strontium chloride and potassium nitrate. Desensitising treatments are separated into two groups: at-home procedures in the form of mouthwash and toothpaste, or in-office products such as resin sealers, glass ionomers and dentine solutions. These desensitising agents are prescribed to block nerve impulses by physically reducing the width of dentinal tubules or chemically preventing the transmission of the stimuli across dentin.

Recently, laser treatment has been proposed as a potential method of treating dentine hypersensitivity. Low-output lasers may be used to block the electric transmission of stimuli to pulpal nerves whereas high-output lasers are being considered as an alternate method of occluding the dentinal tubules. Occlusion using lasers may occur in two forms: through partial melting, or through clotting the fluid proteins within the tubules.

== See also ==
- Dentin hypersensitivity
