= Phoenix abscess =

- Symptoms: Pain, loss of dental vitality, tenderness, dental mobility
- Causes: Complication of root canal treatment or endodontic procedures, chronic apical periodontitis
- Diagnostic method: Clinical and radiographic features
- Treatment: Further endodontic treatment, antibiotics and analgesics, debridement, extraction, bite adjustment

A phoenix abscess is an acute exacerbation of a chronic periapical lesion. It is a dental abscess that can occur immediately following root canal treatment. Another cause is due to untreated necrotic pulp (chronic apical periodontitis). It is also the result of inadequate debridement during the endodontic procedure. Risk of occurrence of a phoenix abscess is minimised by correct identification and instrumentation of the entire root canal, ensuring no missed anatomy.

Treatment involves repeating the endodontic treatment with improved debridement, or tooth extraction. Antibiotics might be indicated to control a spreading or systemic infection.

== Causes ==
Phoenix abscesses are believed to be due to a changing internal environment of the root canal system during the instrumentation stage of root canal treatment, causing a sudden worsening of the symptoms of chronic periradicular periodontitis. This instrumentation is thought to stimulate the residual microbes in the root canal space to cause an inflammatory reaction. These microbes are predominantly facultative anaerobic gram-positive bacteria, such as Streptococcus, Enterococcus and Actinomyces species. Another cause of a phoenix abscess is a decrease in a patient's resistance to these bacteria and their products.

== Signs & Symptoms ==
=== Clinical Features ===
- Pain

A common clinical feature is exacerbated and exaggerated pain. There may or may not be associated with pus & suppuration. The signs & symptoms are similar to that of an acute periradicular abscess, but with a periradicular radiolucency present as well.

- Loss of Vitality

The problematic tooth will have a non-vital pulp with no previous symptoms. Vitality of teeth can be assessed through various means. Common tests would include ethyl chloride test or electric pulp test. Other examples of tests would be laser Doppler flowmetry (LDF), pulse oximetry etc.

- Tender to Touch

The tooth is extremely tender to touch, and it may be high on occlusion as it may be extruded from the socket.

- Mobile

Mobility may be observed.

=== Radiographic Features ===
Radiographically, there will be a periapical lesion associated with the tooth. This lesion is normally existent prior to this episode. Widened periodontal ligament (PDL) space is visible.

== Treatment ==
For most situations urgent treatment is required to eliminate the pain and swelling.

=== 1) Further Endodontic Treatment ===
Further root canal treatment is often the best option. Firstly, the tooth should be accessed and thoroughly irrigated using sodium hypochlorite. Following this the canals should be dried using paper points. The tooth should then be debrided, and drainage established.

=== 2) Medications ===
==== i) Antibiotics ====
In certain circumstances it may be necessary to provide an antibiotic. These circumstances include the presence of a diffuse swelling or cellulitis, when immediate drainage cannot be achieved, or the patient has systemic involvement.

==== ii) Analgesics ====
Analgesics may also be advised for pain control.

=== 3) Extraction ===
If the tooth is unrestorable then extraction may also be an option.

=== 4) Bite Adjustment ===
Adjusting the bite may provide some relief but this will not be a permanent solution to the problem.
