= The Terminal Bar =

1982 novel

- Author: Larry Mitchell
- Language: English
- Published: 1982
- Publication place: United States

The Terminal Bar is a 1982 novel by Larry Mitchell. It was published by Mitchell's own literary press, Calamus Books, and received mixed reception in the gay press. It was among the first novels that dealt with HIV/AIDS in the United States.

== Background and publication ==
The novel was published in 1982 by Calamus Books in New York—his own literary press—and sold for $6. Its name comes from the Terminal Bar in New York City, and is written as a semi-autobiographical account of Mitchell's life. He earlier wrote and published The Faggots & Their Friends Between Revolutions in 1977, and wrote The Terminal Bar shortly after moving to the Lower East Side.

== Plot ==
The novel is set around the time of the Three Mile Island accident. It follows Robin and his friends—a group of "faggots and dykes", according to one reviewer, most of whom grew up in the 1960s—in the East Village of New York City. Robin is a contemplative gay man, who in the opening scenes thinks about the death of Chilean president Salvador Allende and the criminalization of homosexuality in Iran. He escapes to the Terminal Bar to avoid becoming depressed and talks with his friends.

== Reception ==
The book was criticized by reviewer Rob Kaplan as lacking skill "with the technical aspects of narration and structure", though Kaplan also said the book held an important spot in society through its authentic and sensitive portrayal of gay life in New York. LGBT scholar Craig Allen Seymour II wrote that The Terminal Bar, just like Mitchell's earlier book, The Faggots & Their Friends Between Revolutions, was a novel deeply connected to political issues (such as environmental degradation), though Mitchell left the fantasy genre to write a more realistic one. Reviewer David Fields praised the novel's political and satirical tone, and said that the political issues of the early 1980s were largely the same as the 1960s.

During the 1984 customs raid of Gay's the Word, a gay bookstore in London, The Terminal Bar was among the books seized for being obscene, in violation of the Obscene Publications Act 1959.

In 1998, contributors to the Encyclopedia of AIDS recognized the novel as perhaps the first fictionalized narrative that dealt with HIV/AIDS; Mitchell's New York-based novel preceded Babycakes by Armistead Maupin and A Day in San Francisco by Dorothy Bryant, which were among the first San Francisco-based pieces of fiction that dealt with HIV/AIDS (both published in 1983).
