= Pulpitis =

Inflammation of inner tissue (pulp) of a tooth

- Specialty: Dentistry

Pulpitis is inflammation of dental pulp tissue. The pulp contains the blood vessels, the nerves, and connective tissue inside a tooth and provides the tooth's blood and nutrients. Pulpitis is mainly caused by bacterial infection which itself is a secondary development of caries (tooth decay). It manifests itself in the form of a toothache.

== Signs and symptoms ==
Increased sensitivity to stimuli, specifically hot and cold, is a common symptom of pulpitis. A prolonged throbbing pain may be associated with the disease. However, pulpitis can also occur without any pain.

Reversible pulpitis is characterised by intermittent, brief discomfort initiated by a hot, cold or sweet stimulus. The pain evoked is of short duration and there is no lingering or spontaneous pain. The pain ceases within a short period after removal of the stimulus. With a reversible pulpitis, sleep is usually not affected and no analgesics are necessary. Usually, no atypical change is evident on the radiograph. Pulp vitality tests are positive and it is possible to preserve a healthy vital pulp.

Irreversible pulpitis, in contrast, is characterised by a constant severe pain that arises without provocation. Characteristics may include sharp pain upon thermal stimulus, lingering thermal pain, spontaneity, and referred pain. Sometimes, the pain may be accentuated by postural changes such as lying down or bending over. If a stimulus is applied, the pain persists for minutes or hours after removal of the stimulus. These indicate that the vital inflamed pulp is not capable of healing and it is often indicated for the pulp to be removed as it is too damaged. Sleep may be disturbed and over-the-counter painkillers are often taken in an attempt to provide relief, but are usually ineffective.

== Causes ==
Pulpitis may be caused by bacteria from dental caries that penetrate through the enamel and dentin to reach the pulp, or it may be mechanical, a result of trauma, such as physical damage to the tooth.

Inflammation is commonly associated with a bacterial infection but can also be due to other insults such as repetitive trauma or in rare cases periodontitis. The inflammation of dental pulp is mainly caused by an opportunistic infection of the pulp by a commensal oral microorganism. To reach the pulp, the most common route of the microorganism is through dental caries as well as from trauma, dentinal cracks and exposed dentin. Exposed dentin gives the microorganisms access to the pulp of the tooth through the dentinal tubules. In the case of penetrating decay, the pulp chamber is no longer sealed off from the environment of the oral cavity.

When the pulp becomes inflamed, pressure begins to build up in the pulp cavity, exerting pressure on the nerve of the tooth and the surrounding tissues. Pressure from inflammation can cause mild to extreme pain, depending upon the severity of the inflammation and the body's response. Unlike other parts of the body where pressure can dissipate through the surrounding soft tissues, the pulp cavity is very different. It is surrounded by dentin, a hard tissue that does not allow for pressure dissipation, so increased blood flow, a hallmark of inflammation, will cause pain.

The infection can also come from the apical foramen of the root. Cells in the dental pulp trigger an immune response from the invasion of foreign microorganisms. The inflammation of the pulp is a side effect of the immune response and causes pain.

Pulpitis can often create so much pressure on the tooth nerve that the individual will have trouble locating the source of the pain, confusing it with neighboring teeth, called referred pain. The pulp cavity inherently provides the body with an immune system response challenge, which makes it very difficult for a bacterial infection to be eliminated.

If the teeth are denervated, this can lead to irreversible pulpitis, depending on the area, rate of infection, and length of injury. This is why people who have lost their dental innervation have a reduced healing ability and increased rate of tooth injury. Thus, as people age, their gradual loss of innervation leads to pulpitis.

== Responses ==
=== Inflammatory response ===
In the pulp, just as in other areas of the body, inflammation can be present. Inflammation of the pulp does not take place until the bacteria in the decay have reached the pulp. Bacterial products may reach the pulp much earlier and begin the inflammatory response. The inflammation may be acute or chronic because just like other tissues in the body, the pulp will react to irritants with innate and/or adaptive immune responses.

Innate immunity in the pulp is not specific but uses receptors to recognize molecular patterns common to microbes to initiate bacterial killing (phagocytosis). The components of the innate response of the dentin/pulp complex to caries include at least the following six: (1) outward flow of dentinal fluid; (2) odontoblasts; (3) neuropeptides and neurogenic inflammation; (4) innate immune cells, including immature dendritic cells (DCs), natural killer (NK) cells, and T cells, as well as (5) their cytokines and (6) chemokines. Although the first two items are not classic components of innate immunity, they are uniquely involved in the initial inflammatory response to caries.

Odontoblasts, (the cells that form dentin) have cellular processes that extend into dentinal tubules and are the first to encounter the caries bacterial antigens. They express low levels of interleukin 8 (IL-8) and genes related to chemokines and chemokine receptors. The odontoblasts have been shown to attract immature dendritic cells.

Dendritic cells (DCs) are a heterogeneous leukocyte (white blood cell) population. DCs in healthy peripheral tissues (steady state) are in an immature state. The cells are capable of sensing microbes as well as antigen capture and processing capabilities. A rapid accumulation of pulpal DCs has been observed beneath cavity preparations, and an increased number of DCs accumulated under caries. Immature DCs are therefore considered to be part of the innate phase of pulpal immune response.

Persistent infection leads to the activation of adaptive immunity. A transition to an adaptive immune response will take place in the dental pulp as the caries and bacteria approach the pulp. Antigens are recognized individually and lines of lymphocytes are developed to produce specific antibodies which attach to the recognized cells and initiate their destruction. Phagocytes remove the remains. B cells and T cells are the major lymphocytes involved.

A variety of cytokines have been observed in the pulp. Patients with symptomatic and asymptomatic irreversible pulpitis have been shown to have an almost 23-fold increase in the cytokine IL-8 in the pulp. Cytokines in the pulp interact with each other. The ultimate effect on pulpal inflammation and healing is dependent upon the integrated actions of these inflammatory mediators.

In addition to the lymphocytes, macrophages also provide defense against certain intracellular pathogens. Activated macrophages can function as class II antigen-presenting cells, similar to pulpal dendritic and B cells. In addition, activated macrophages secrete many inflammatory mediators.

Macrophages in the pulp become activated after receiving two signals. The first is a priming stimulus and the second is an activating signal. The priming stimulus is secreted by activated T-helper cells. The activating stimulus may include bacterial lipopolysaccharides, muramyl dipeptide, and other chemical mediators.

Macrophages are professional phagocytes in innate immune responses. Activated macrophages are effective killers that eliminate pathogens in both innate and adaptive immune responses, and are also important in tissue homeostasis, through the clearance of senescent cells, and in remodeling and repair of tissue after inflammation. The number of macrophages increases with the progression of caries and is always higher than that of DCs at all stages of the caries invasion.

=== Neurological responses ===
According to the Brännström's hydrodynamic theory, activated nociceptors from fluid movement and other irritants through the patent dentine tubules result in pulp pain. Unmyelinated, slow conducting C-fibers aid in feeling a slowset, burning pain. According to neuronal studies, 70-80% of pulpal axons are unmyelinated. Highly myelinated Aδ-fibers, which allow for fast conduction, are responsible for the sharp, shooting pain.

Thus, the stimulus intensities are based on various fibers. Fast-conducting Aβ and Aδ-fibers provide the lowest stimulus intensities (typically referred to as prepain sensations), and those sensations eventually receive higher stimulation levels. The dull aches are associated with C-fibers and slow Aδ-fibers. As inflammation intensifies, the A-fibers are increasingly activated. C-fiber innervation and Aδ-fibers are polymodal receptors that are sensitive to capsaicin and inflammatory mediators.

The pain mechanisms associated with pulpitis are similar to those of the rest of the body (i.e. receptors, intracellular signaling, transmitters, etc.). The inflammatory mediators act on specific receptors relating to nociceptive neurons, leading to the production of second messengers and activation of phospholipases and protein kinases. The second messengers regulate receptors ion channels that deal with sensitization. The ion channels open based on pain stimuli propagating action potentials in sensory neurons.

In order for excitability and conduction to occur, voltage-gated sodium channels must be activated. Changes in sodium channel (NaCH) expression occur after inflammatory lesions, which may generate different pain states seen when neuronal fibers are activated. Studies have been done on major NaCh isoforms to examine expression patterns. Nav1.6 nodal accumulations do not vary in size or immunofluorescence staining activity in typical or atypical nodal sites; however, the proportion of typical nodal sites decreases and increase in atypical nodes in painful tooth samples compared to normal tooth samples. Nav1.7 has an increased expression in typical and atypical nodal sites in painful samples. As a result, an increased co-expression of multiple isoforms at demyelinating nodal sites in painful dental pulp. This isoforms of sodium channels may be a main factor in pain sensations due to their production of axonal excitability properties.

Neuropeptides are increasingly being researched for having a role in molecular mechanisms involved with pain, including ion channels and inflammation. Substance P (SP) is a neuropeptide produced by capsaicin neuron cell bodies (localized in trigeminal ganglia and dorsal root) and plays a major role in dental pain and inflammation. Other peptides include cGRP, galanin, somatostatin, and neurokinin A-B. The biological effects of SP are expressed by the binding of specific G protein-coupled NK receptors. Interaction with SP receptors induces vasodilation and allows for plasma extravasation and mastocyte degranulation. SP is highly expressed in dental pulp and dentin. When pain, thermal, and/or chemical stimulation is present, SP production and release increases. Current studies focus on whether controlling Substance P expression may control tooth pain.

In addition, dental caries is more likely to develop pulpitis due to less time for the dental pulp to react and protect itself by occluding the dentinal tubules. Based on the tooth injury, sensory nerve fibers react to pulpitis by growing terminal branches into the adjacent surviving pulp, which also changes the cytochemical phenotype. This neural growth typically lasts for a few days and function and form is retained. Thus, pain is poorly localized, and the level of pain stemming from pulpitis varies based on severity, quality, duration, onset, trigger.

As caries invades dentin, the number of permeable dentinal tubules correlates with the degree of pain. Intrapulp pressure have an effect on the sensory nerves of varying diameters: blocking larger diameter Aδ-fibres and activating smaller C-fibers. Under hypoxic environments and pulp degeneration (symptom of pulpitis), C-fibers may still function. Once reparative dentin forms, odontoblasts associated with the dentin change, and the pulpal fibroblasts lose p75 expression, which is a neurotrophin receptor.

== Diagnosis ==
Pulp sensibility tests are routinely used in the diagnosis of pulpitis. Pulp testing is combined with information taken from history, examination and other special investigations such as radiographs in order to reach a diagnosis. Pulp sensibility tests assess the pulp's sensory response to a stimulus. There are three general types:

- Thermal: Agents are applied to increase or decrease the temperature of a tooth and stimulate a pulp sensory response.

Cold tests: Most commonly, ethyl chloride is sprayed onto a small ball of cotton wool and is applied to the tooth, which produces intense cold. Alternatively, CO_{2} snow and other refrigerants such as dichlorodifluoromethane (DDM) have been shown to be effective.

Heat tests: Gutta percha can be heated and directly applied to the tooth to produce heat.

- Electrical pulp test: Electric pulp testing (EPT) has been available for over a century and is used by dentists worldwide. It is used to determine the health of the pulp and pulp-related pain.

EPT is based on the stimulation of sensory nerves in the pulp. It does not provide information on vascular supply to the pulp. The probe tip of the test device is placed directly onto the tooth surface and an electrical stimulus is produced. This stimulus causes an ionic change across the neural membrane, inducing an action potential in the myelinated nerves. The threshold of pain is determined by increasing the voltage. A tingling sensation is felt once the voltage reaches the pain threshold. This threshold level varies between patients, and is affected by factors such as age, pain perception, tooth surface conduction and resistance.

The requirements of an EPT are appropriate application method, careful interpretation of the results, and an appropriate stimulus. EPT must be done with tooth isolation and conduction media. Key factors in pulp testing are the enamel and dentine thickness, and the number of nerve fibers in the underlying the pulp. EPT is not used in patients with orthodontic bands or crowned teeth, as the current may be conducted to adjacent teeth, resulting in false-positive responses. Pulp nerve fibers also respond to lower current intensities and only a small number of pulpal nerves are required to create responses when electrical stimulation is applied. This means that EPT may result in false-positive responses in teeth with pulpal necrosis. Furthermore, as pulpal and periodontal nerve thresholds overlap, the periodontal nerves may give a false indication of tooth sensibility.

Possible explanations for false-positives include:

- Response caused by conduction of the current because of periodontal or gingival issues
- Breakdown products associated with pulp necrosis may be able to conduct electric current next to infected and hypersensitive pulp tissue
- Inflamed pulp tissue may still be present
- Metallic restorations or orthodontic gear are still present

Studies have indicated that there is little correlation between histopathological status of the pulp and clinical information. A negative EPT response showed localized necrosis in 25.7% of cases and 72% of cases. Thus, 97.7% of cases with a negative response to EPT indicated that a root canal treatment should be carried out.

- Test cavity: The preparation of a test cavity involves cutting into the dentine of a tooth to determine whether the sensory element of the pulp is still functioning. Test cavity preparation is a last resort as this method is considered invasive and irreversible. It is also unlikely that this procedure would provide any more information than thermal and electric pulp sensibility tests. Therefore, test cavities are not generally used in practice as a means of testing pulp sensibility.

== Treatment ==
Once the pulp has become inflamed, the tooth state can be diagnostically divided into two categories: reversible pulpitis and irreversible pulpitis.

=== Reversible ===
This is the condition where the pulp is inflamed and is actively responding to an irritant. This may include a carious lesion that has not reached the pulp.

Symptoms include transient pain or sensitivity resulting from many stimuli, notably hot, cold, sweet, water and touch. The pulp is still considered to be vital. This means that once the irritant is eliminated, usually by removal of decay and the placement of a restoration, that the pulp will return to its normal, healthy state. When it becomes painful and decayed the tooth may become known as a "hot tooth" and local anesthetic may not work as well.

=== Irreversible ===
This is the condition where the pulp is irreversibly damaged. The pulp cannot recover from the insult and damage. For example, decay that has reached the pulp of the tooth introduces bacteria into the pulp. The pulp is still alive, but the introduction of bacteria into the pulp will not allow the pulp to heal and it will ultimately result in necrosis, or death, of the pulp tissue.

Symptoms associated with irreversible pulpitis may include dull aching, pain from hot or cold (though cold may actually provide relief), lingering pain after removal of a stimulus, spontaneous pain, or referred pain.

Clinical signs may include reduced response to electronic pulp testing and painful response to thermal stimuli. Today electronic pulp testers are rarely used for diagnosis of the reversibility of pulpitis due to their unreliable nature. Instead they should only be used to test the vitality of teeth.

The pulp of a tooth with irreversible pulpitis may not be left alone to heal. That is at least the general viewpoint of the dental profession, and not every dentist would agree that a dead tooth must be treated. No statistics are known but it is possible to have a trouble-free tooth after irreversible pulpitis, albeit a dead tooth. The tooth may be endodontically treated whereby the pulp is removed and replaced by gutta percha. An alternative is extraction of the tooth. This may be required if there is insufficient coronal tissue remaining for restoration once the root canal therapy has been completed.
