= James Smith Turner =

Scottish dentist

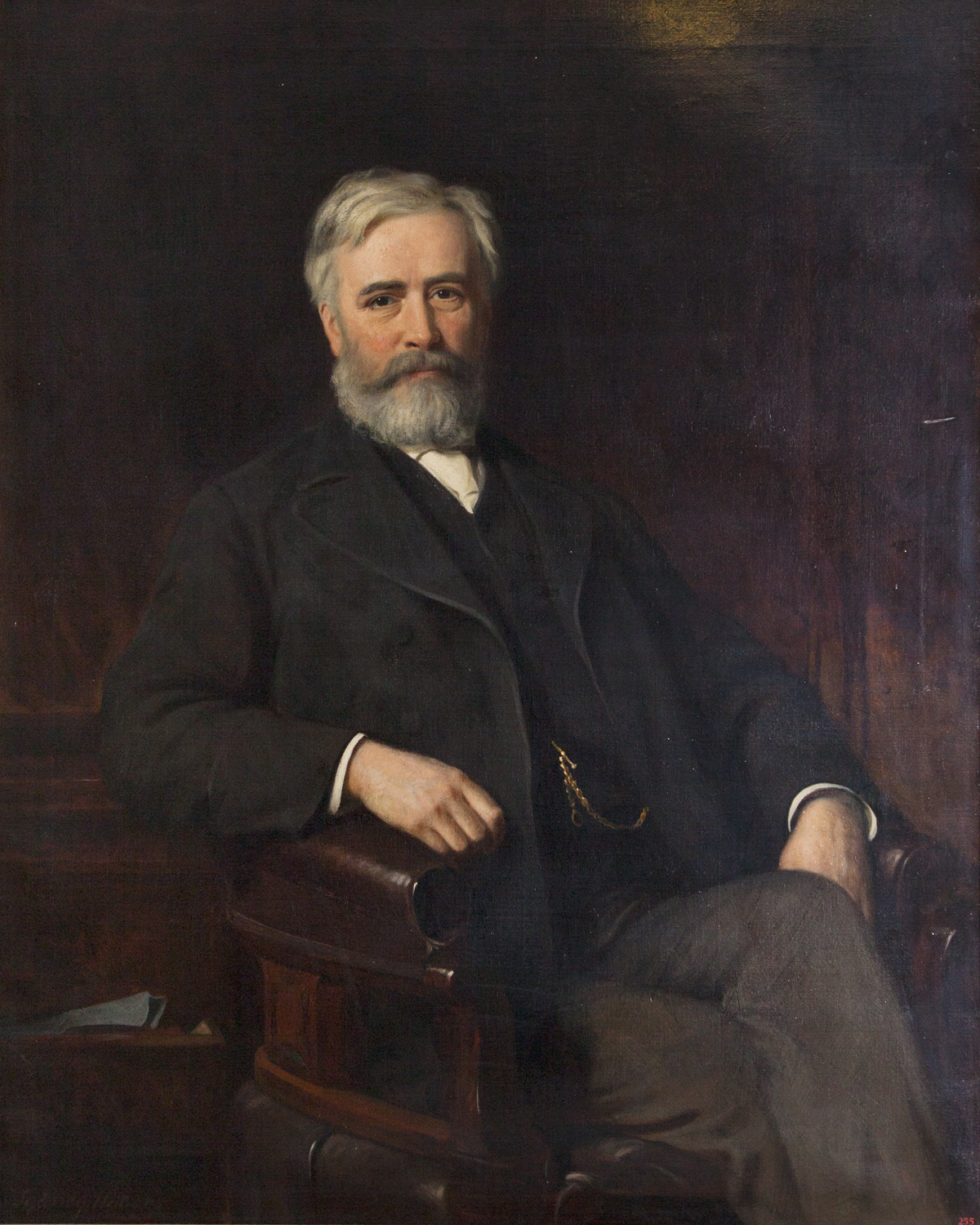
James Smith Turner, 1884 portrait

James Smith Turner (27 May 1832 – 22 February 1904) was a Scottish dentist, known for his role in dental surgery regulation.

== Life ==
Born in Edinburgh on 27 May 1832, he was son of Joseph Turner and Catherine Smith his wife; his father, a hatter, was known as a political speaker against the Corn Laws. At the age 14 Turner was apprenticed to a dentist Mr. Mien of Edinburgh. He went to London in 1853, in 1857 became a member of the college of dentists, and in August 1863 was admitted Member of the Royal College of Surgeons of England. and a licentiate in dental surgery.

Turner was appointed assistant dental surgeon to the Middlesex Hospital 19 July 1864; dental surgeon 16 April 1874; lecturer on dental surgery 2 February 1881, and consulting dental surgeon 22 February 1883. In succession to Robert Hepburn he was lecturer on dental surgery mechanics at the Royal Dental Hospital from 1871 until 1880, becoming consulting dental surgeon in 1896. He was an examiner on the dental board of the Royal College of Surgeons of England 1886–8.

With John Tomes and others, Turner worked to converting dentistry into an organised profession. In 1872 he visited the United States to study the conditions of dental practice there, and in 1875 he began work as secretary of the executive council of the Dental Reform Committee. The object of the committee was to obtain an act of Parliament to regulate dental practice, with a dentists' register, admittance to and removal from which should be under the supervision of the General Medical Council. There was much opposition. The Dentists Act 1878 (41 & 42 Vict. c. 33) was passed by the help of Sir John Lubbock, and received the royal assent on 22 July 1878. On 15 August the dental register was opened, John Tomes's name being the first. The British Dental Association was founded early in 1879, and Turner was for many years the president of its representative board. He also held office at the Odontological Society of Great Britain from 1873 until 1884, when he was chosen president.

Turner died at Ealing, 22 February 1904, and was buried at St. George's cemetery, Ealing. A scholarship in practical dental mechanics was established in his memory, awarded by the British Dental Association.

== Family ==
Turner married:

1. in November 1866 Annie, daughter of Richard Whitbourn of Godalming, by whom he left five sons and three daughters;
2. in December 1900 Agnes, daughter of the Rev. Henry Ward, M.A.

== Notes ==
Attribution

This article incorporates text from a publication now in the public domain: Lee, Sidney, ed. (1912). "Turner, James Smith". Dictionary of National Biography (2nd supplement). Vol. 3. London: Smith, Elder & Co.
