= Terminal Bar (bar) =

Bar in New York City (1958–82)

Coordinates: 40.7563°N 73.990108°W

- Interactive map of Terminal Bar
- Location: NE corner of 8th Avenue and 41st Street, New York City, New York, United States
- Owner: Murray Goldman
- Type: Bar

Construction
- Opened: 1958
- Closed: 1982

Terminal Bar was a bar on Times Square in New York City at 41st Street and 8th Avenue. It had a reputation as one of the roughest bars in the city and was located across from the Port Authority Bus Terminal. Terminal Bar originally had a mainly Irish American clientele, but over time evolved into a predominantly African American and gay bar.

The Terminal Bar was featured in the Martin Scorsese film Taxi Driver and was the subject of an award-winning American documentary short film, Terminal Bar, directed by Stefan Nadelman that used a combination of animation, live action and black-and-white photography of Terminal Bar's former patrons taken by the director's father, bartender Sheldon Nadelman, from 1972 to 1982. Scorsese paid tribute again in 1985, featuring a pub called "The Terminal Bar" in his film After Hours; The Emerald Pub in SoHo stood in for the defunct Terminal Bar.

A collection of Sheldon Nadelman's Terminal Bar photos was released in book form in 2014 entitled, Terminal Bar: A Photographic Record of New York's Most Notorious Watering Hole.

The bar was also featured in the 1982 novel The Terminal Bar.

The Terminal Bar closed in 1982. The area where the Terminal Bar formerly stood is now occupied by The New York Times Building.
