= John Tomes =

English dental surgeon

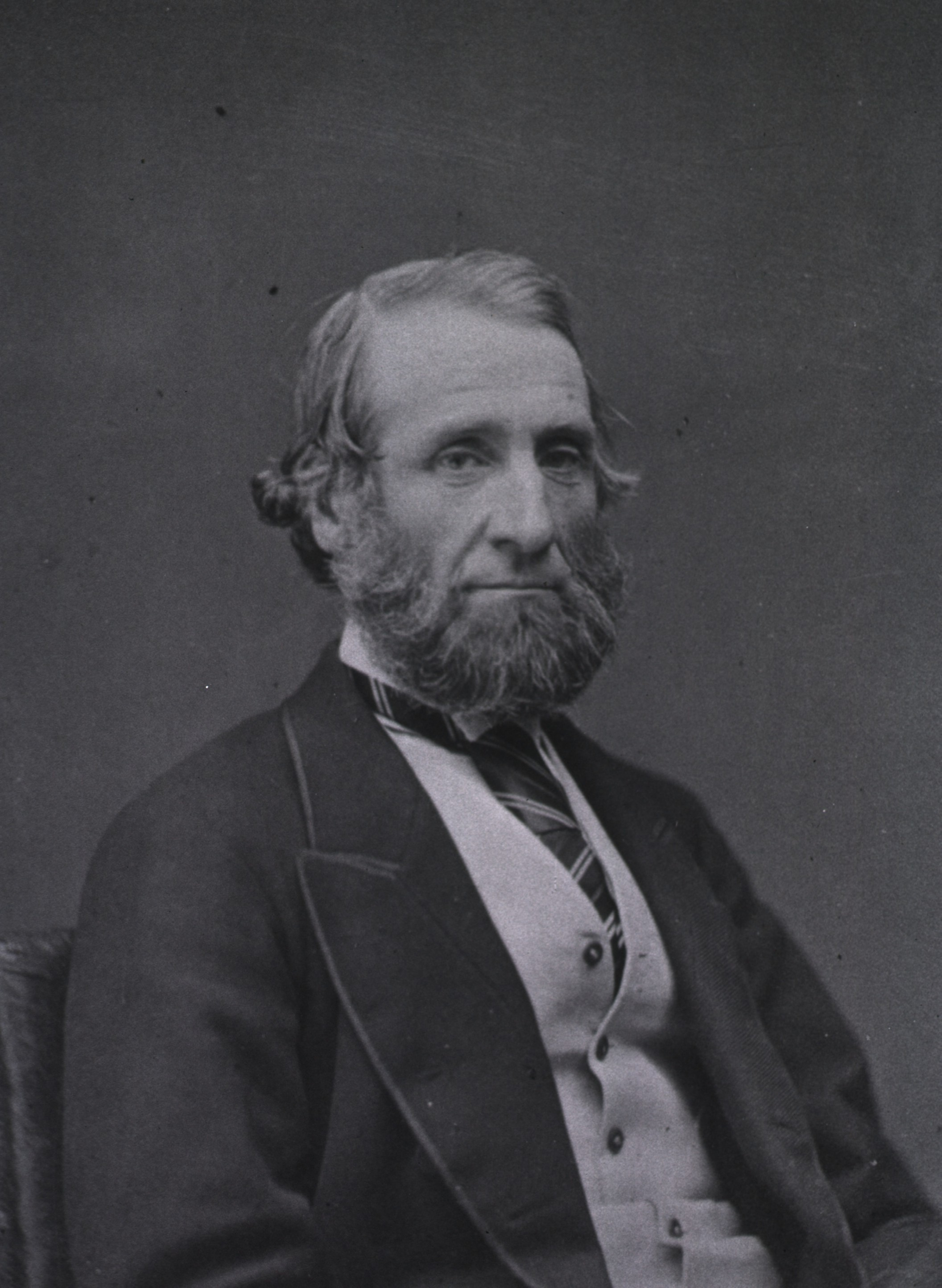
Tomes in 1873

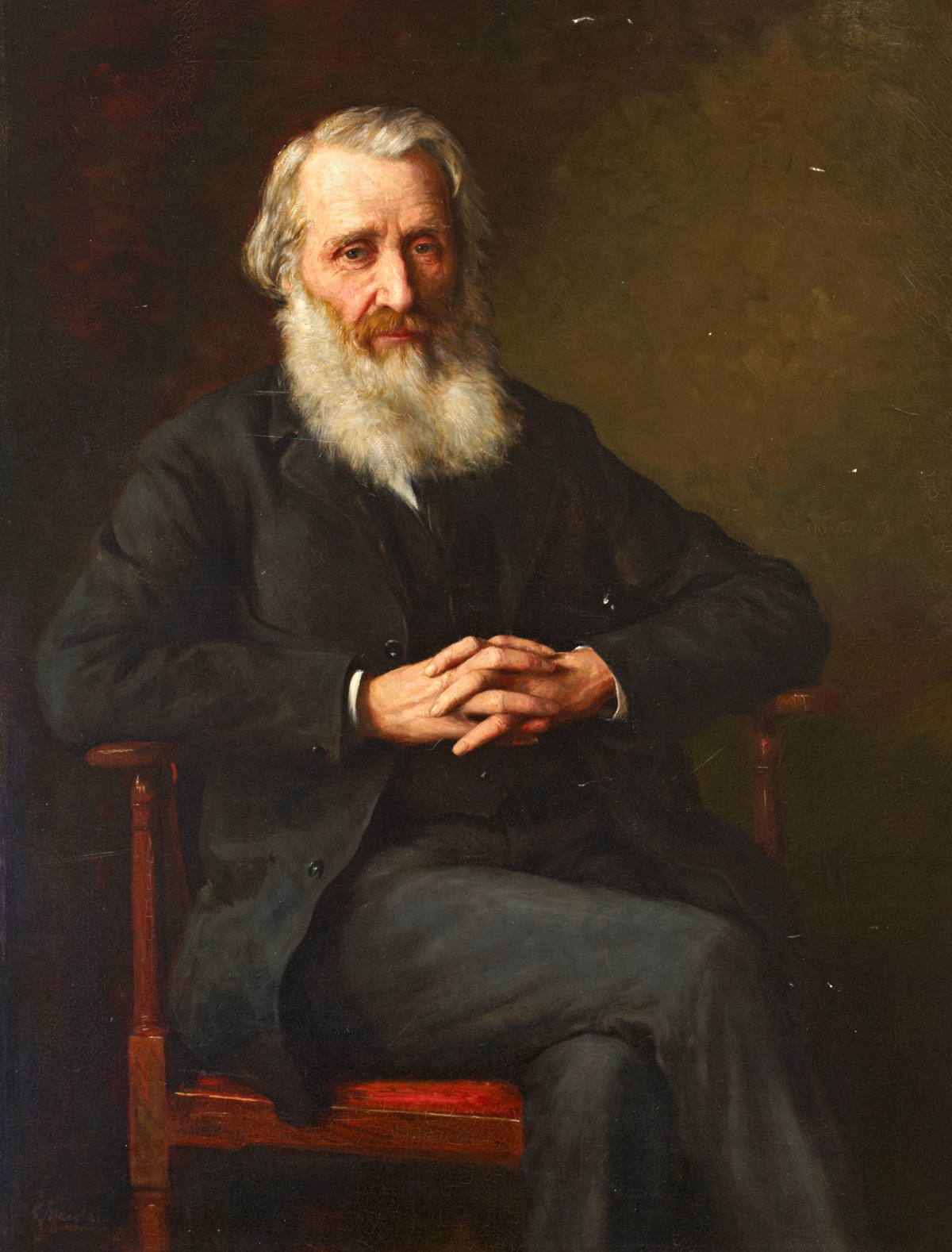
John Tomes by Carlile Henry Hayes Macartney

Sir John Tomes (21 March 1815 – 29 July 1895) was an English dental surgeon.

== Life ==
The eldest son of John Tomes and Sarah, his wife, daughter of William Baylies of Welford-on-Avon, then in Gloucestershire, he was born at Weston-on-Avon in Gloucestershire on 21 March 1815. He was articled in 1831 to Thomas Furley Smith, a medical practitioner in Evesham, and in 1836 he entered the medical schools of King's College, London and the Middlesex Hospital, at that time united. He was house surgeon to the Middlesex Hospital during 1839–40.

Research with Madder on histology of bone and teeth brought Tomes to the notice of Sir Thomas Watson and James Moncrieff Arnott, who advised him to concentrate on dental surgery. He was admitted a member of the College of Surgeons of England on 21 March 1839, and in 1840 he went into practice at 41 Mortimer Street (now Cavendish Place). He was also preoccupied with the question of general anæsthesia, shortly after the introduction of ether into surgical practice by William T. G. Morton, and in 1847 he administered it at the Middlesex Hospital for the extraction of teeth as well as for operations in general surgery. He was admitted a Fellow of the Royal Society on 6 June 1850.

Tomes was one of those who in 1843, and again in 1855, unsuccessfully approached the Royal College of Surgeons of England with the aim of allying dentists with surgeons. In 1858 he was successful in inducing the Royal College of Surgeons to grant a license in dental surgery. He was also one of the main founders in 1856 of the Odontological Society of London and in 1858 of the Dental Hospital, where he was the first to give systematic clinical demonstrations. After the dental licentiateship had been established about twenty years, Tomes, with James Smith Turner, was instrumental in obtaining the Dentists Act 1878 (41 & 42 Vict. c. 33) for the registration of dental professionals.

After carrying on a good practice for many years, Tomes retired in 1876 to Upwood Gorse, Caterham, in Surrey, where he remained for the rest of his life. He was elected on 12 April 1883 an honorary fellow of the Royal College of Surgeons of England, and on 28 May 1886 he was knighted. He was twice president of the Odontological Society, and in 1877 he was elected chairman of the dental reform committee. On the occasion of his golden wedding he was presented with an inkstand, and the rest of the money subscribed was devoted to the endowment of a Royal College prize for researches in the field of dental science. The first recipient of this prize was his son, Charles Sissmore Tomes, in 1896

Tomes died on 29 July 1895, and was buried at St. Mary's, Upper Caterham.

== Works ==
At the Middlesex Hospital, Tomes invented an innovative tooth-extracting forceps with jaws adapted to the forms of the necks of teeth, in place of the dental key. On 3 March 1845, he took out a patent (No. 10538) for a machine for copying in ivory irregular curved surfaces, for which he was awarded the gold medal of the Society of Arts.

Tomes published:

- A Course of Lectures on Dental Physiology and Surgery, London, 1848. These classic lectures from 1845 were delivered at the Middlesex Hospital, but Tomes had trouble attracting an audience.
- On the Structure of the Dental Tissues of the Order Rodentia, 1850, a work examining the structural anatomy of the teeth of rodents.
- A System of Dental Surgery, London, 1859, which became a standard work. A third edition was revised and enlarged by his son C. S. Tomes, London, 1887; it was also translated into French, Paris, 1873. A fifth edition of the work was published in 1906.

He contributed a series of papers on "Bone" and dental tissues to the Philosophical Transactions between 1849 and 1856. His writing on dentine led to the nomenclature "Tomes's fibrils".

Over 1300 tooth preparations made by Tomes and his son were presented to the Royal College of Surgeons of England in 1920. This collection is still held at the Royal College of Surgeons and is particularly rich in microscopic preparations of mammal teeth.

== Family ==
On 15 February 1844 Tomes married Jane, daughter of Robert Sibley of Great Ormond Street, London, an architect. They had one surviving son, Sir Charles Sissmore Tomes, who was also a dental surgeon. Charles Tomes continued his father's intellectual work and published On the Minute Structure of the Teeth of Creodonts, with especial reference to the suggested resemblance to Marsupials, a work examining the microstructure of the teeth of Borhyaena, Mesonyx, Pachyaena, Oxyaena, Sinopa, Hyaenodon, Didymictis, and Cynodictis.

== See also ==
- Tomes's fibers
- Tomes's process
