= Morgan Bassichis =

American artist

- Born: 1983 (age 42–43); Newton, MA
- Website: www.morganbassichis.com

Morgan Bassichis (born 1983) is an American comedic performer and writer, living and working in New York City.

== Early life ==
Bassichis was born in Newton, MA in 1983. Bassichis actively participated in theater growing up. Their parents were progressive social workers.

They inherited political zeal and musical taste from their mother. After graduating from college, they worked for ten years as an anti-prison activist and educator in San Francisco.

== Politics ==
Bassichis is active in the anti-Zionist group Jewish Voice for Peace.

== Artistic practice ==
=== Performances ===
- Can I Be Frank? - La MaMa Experimental Theatre Club - Directed by Sam Pinkleton - (2024)
- A Crowded Field - Abrons Arts Center - (2023)
- Questions to Ask Beforehand - Bridget Donahue Gallery - Directed by Tina Satter - (2022)
- Don't Rain On My Bat Mitzvah - Creative Time - Rashid Johnson's Red Stage - Co-created with Ira Khonen Temple - (July 4, 2021)
- Nibbling the Hand That Feeds Me - 2019 Whitney Biennial - curated by Rujeko Hockley and Jane Panetta
- Klezmer for Beginners - Abrons Arts Center - Co-created with Ethan Philbrick - (2019)
- Damned If You Duet - The Kitchen - (2018)
- More Protest Songs! - Danspace Project - (2018)
- Me But Also Everybody (Part IV) - Hirshhorn Museum and Sculpture Garden - (2018)
- The Faggots & Their Friends Between Revolutions: The Musical - the New Museum - (2017)
- Senior Energy - Portland Institute for Contemporary Art - (2017)
- Me, But Also Everybody! (Part 1-III) - MoMA PS1 - (2015)

=== Grants, residencies, & awards ===
- Robert Rauschenberg Foundation - 2017 Resident
- Art Matters Foundation - 2015 Grantee
- Lower Manhattan Cultural Council - 2015 Process Space Artist

=== Writing ===
- The Odd Years (Wendy's Subway, 2020)
- Essay in the 2019 edition of The Faggots & Their Friends Between Revolutions (Nightboat Books)
- co-ed. Questions to Ask Before Your Bat Mitzvah (Wendy's Subway, 2023)
