= Dental pulp test =

Clinical aid

Dental pulpal testing is a clinical and diagnostic aid used in dentistry to help establish the health of the dental pulp within the pulp chamber and root canals of a tooth. Such investigations are important in aiding dentists in devising a treatment plan for the tooth being tested.

There are two major types of dental pulp tests. Vitality testing assesses the blood supply to the tooth, while sensitivity testing tests the sensory supply.

== Clinical application ==
Dental pulp tests are valuable techniques used to establish the pulpal health status of a tooth in dentistry. The diagnostic information obtained from pulpal testing is then used alongside a patient's history, clinical and radiographic findings to determine a diagnosis and prognosis of the tooth.

Pulp tests are useful for the following procedures in dentistry:

- diagnosis of endodontic pathology,
- localisation of tooth pain,
- differentiating between odontogenic and non-odontogenic pain,
- assessing pulpal status following dental trauma,
- establishment of pulpal health prior to prosthodontic treatment.

Pulpal tests may be conducted via stimulation of the sensory fibres within the pulp (sensitivity testing) or by assessing pulpal blood flow (vitality testing). All available techniques are reported to have limitations in terms of accuracy and reproducibility and therefore require careful interpretation in clinical practice.

== Sensitivity testing ==
Sensitivity tests assess the sensory response of a tooth to an external stimulus, results which may be extrapolated to indirectly determine pulpal health status. Sensory stimuli, such as heat, cold, or an electrical current, are applied to the tooth in question to stimulate the nocireceptors within the pulp. The type of sensory fibres activated and therefore the response felt by the patient depends on the stimulus used. Sensibility testing is based on Brännström's hydrodynamic theory, which postulates that the activation of nocireceptors is caused by fluid movement within the dentinal tubules in response to thermal, electrical, mechanical, or osmotic stimuli.

=== Responses to sensitivity testing ===
There are three primary outcomes of a pulp sensitivity test:

- A normal response — healthy pulps respond to sensitivity testing by eliciting a short, sharp pain which subsides when the stimulus is removed, indicating that the nerve fibres are present and responsive.
- A heightened or prolonged response — an exaggerated or lingering response to sensitivity testing indicates some degree of pulpal inflammation. If the pain is pronounced yet subsides once the stimulus has been removed, a diagnosis of reversible pulpitis may be probable. However, a lingering pain that continues despite the removal of the stimulus is indicative of irreversible pulpitis.
- No response — lack of response to sensitivity testing suggests that the nerve supply to the tooth has been diminished, as in the case of pulpal necrosis or in previously root treated canals.

=== Types of sensitivity tests ===
==== Thermal tests ====
Thermal testing, which involves the application of either hot or cold stimuli to the tooth, is the most common form of sensibility test.

A number of products are available for cold testing, each with varying melting points. Although household ice (0 °C [32 °F]) is cheap and easy to obtain, it is not as accurate as colder products. Dry ice (−78 °C [−108 °F]) can be used; however, there have been concerns regarding the damaging effects of using something so cold in the oral cavity despite evidence to suggest that dry ice has no negative impact on mucosal or tooth structure. Refrigerant sprays, such as ethyl chloride (−12.3 °C [9.9 °F]), 1,1,1,2-tetrafluoroethane (−26.5 °C [−15.7 °F]) or a propane/butane/isobutane gas mixture are further commonly used cold tests. Cold testing is thought to stimulate Type Aδ fibres in the pulpal tissue, which elicit a short, sharp pain.

Heat tests include using heated instruments, such as a ball-ended probe or gutta-percha, a rubber commonly used in root canal procedures. Such tests are less commonly used, as they are thought to be less accurate than cold tests and may be more likely to cause damage to the teeth and surrounding mucosa.

==== Electric pulp testing ====
An electrical current can be applied to the tooth to generate an action potential in the Type Aδ fibres within pulp, eliciting a neurological response. Such tests are conducted by applying a conducting medium (e.g., toothpaste) on a dried tooth and placing the probe tip of an electric pulp tester on the surface of the tooth closest to the pulp horn(s). The patient is then directed to hold the end of the conducting probe to complete the circuit and asked to let go of the probe when a 'tingling' sensation is felt.

The use of electric pulp testing has been questioned in patients with traditional cardiac pacemakers despite no evidence of interferences in humans, particularly with more modern devices. Care must be taken if using an electric pulp test on a tooth adjacent to metallic restorations, as these can create electrical conduction and yield false negative results.

==== Anaesthesia testing ====
When pulp testing results are inconclusive and patients cannot localise or specify their pain or symptoms, an anaesthetic could be helpful and be used. The most posterior tooth in the area where the pain resonates undergoes anaesthesia, by either infiltration or intraligamentary injection, until pain diminishes. If the pain is still present, the procedure is repeated on the mesial teeth, one by one, until the pain diminishes and is gone. If one can still not determine the source of the pain, the procedure will be repeated on the opposite arch. In a case where the pain cannot be localised to either the maxillary or mandibular arch, an inferior alveolar nerve block would be used. If the pain stops, such would imply that it involves teeth of the mandibular arch.

==== Test cavity ====
The test cavity technique is used as a last resort when results produced by all other methods above are inconclusive. High-speed burs are used without anaesthetic, drilling through enamel, or restorations to dentine. Throughout the drilling process, the patient is asked whether a painful sensation is felt, which would indicate pulpal vitality. In the event of a vital pulp, a painful response is provoked when dentin is contacted by the bur and the procedure will be stopped. A restoration would be then placed. Contrarily, when compared with vital pulp, pulp with partial necrosis will not be stimulated as extensively. In the case of partial necrosis, access to and into dentine would be needed, with the dentist progressively drilling deeper into dentine, checking the sensory response—which is usually without sensory response because of the partial necrosis. Due to the invasiveness and possible anxiety it may generate in patients, the test cavity technique is generally avoided. Also, there is little literature supporting its effectiveness, and it has been relatively anecdotal within clinical practice.

=== Limitations of sensitivity testing ===
All tests have some limitations, and test results should be interpreted by an experienced dentist under the bidirectional consideration of both clinical symptoms and radiography. Sensitivity tests only indicate the presence or absence of the nerve supply to an individual tooth. Although a prolonged response to aforementioned tests indicate pulpal inflammation, the degree of inflammation or innervation cannot be inferred from these tests.

False positive or false negative results are possible when performing a sensitivity testing. A false positive response occurs when a patient is respondent to sensitivity testing despite a lack of sensory tissue in the tooth being tested. Such responses may occur due to innervation of adjacent teeth due to inadequate isolation of the tooth being tested, or in anxious patients who perceive pain despite no sensory stimulus, or in multi-rooted teeth which still have residual pulpal tissue residing in canals. False negative results occurs when innervated teeth do not respond to sensibility testing. Such can occur in individuals who have recently traumatised teeth, teeth with incomplete root development, teeth with heavy restorations, or teeth that have significantly reduced pulp size due to production of tertiary or sclerotic dentine.

Pulpal sensitivity testing may be regarded as inferior to vitality testing, as they do not definitively prove that the tooth has a blood supply and is vital. Nonetheless, electric pulp testing and cold testing tests have been found to be accurate and reliable in the case of assessing pulpal health, especially when tests are used in combination. In addition, cold testing is also more accurate than electric pulp in the case of running tests on immature or traumatised teeth.

Despite the insights gained from sensitivity testing, a research study found that the density of nerve fibers and blood vessels in the pulp tissue, and the degree of oxygen saturation, may play a crucial role in interpreting the results. The presence of a higher density of nerve fibers may contribute to a lower threshold for electrical stimulation, suggesting the involvement of neural factors in pulp sensibility. Moreover, the positive correlation between blood vessel density and oxygen saturation, as well as the negative correlation between nerve fiber density and electrical voltage perception, provide valuable insights into the complex nature of dental pulp. Therefore, in addition to the standard sensitivity testing, more objective and accurate methods such as pulse oximetry might be necessary for a comprehensive understanding of pulp vitality. However, the findings of this study should be generalized with caution due to its small sample size and focus on healthy teeth extracted for orthodontic reasons.

== Vitality testing ==
Vitality tests assess the vascular supply of a tooth. Vascular supply is generally accepted as the earliest indicator of pulpal health. However, vitality tests have limitations and require strict adherence to correct application techniques. The diagnostic methods to assess the vascular response of the pulp include:

=== Laser Doppler flowmetry ===
Laser Doppler flowmetry is able to assess blood flow within the dental pulp directly. A laser beam directed onto the tooth follows the path of dentinal tubules to the pulp. The viability of the vascular supply of the pulp is determined by the output signal generated by the backscattered reflected light from circulating blood cells. The reflected light is Doppler-shifted and has a different frequency to those reflected by the surrounding tissues, which are static. An arbitrary unit of measurement, 'perfusion unit' (PU), is used to measure the concentration and velocity (flux) of blood cells. The output of laser Doppler flowmetry may be influenced by the blood flow in surrounding tissues, and therefore, the test tooth must be adequately isolated to avoid inaccuracies.

=== Pulse oximetry ===
Pulse oximetry utilises the difference in red and infrared light absorption by oxygenated and deoxygenated red blood cells within blood circulation to determine the oxygen saturation level (SaO2). Pulse oximetry, as well as laser Doppler flowmetry vitality tests, may not truly reflect the real state of health of the dental pulp. This mainly happens in clinical scenarios when the dental pulp is diseased, yet a viable blood supply is maintained. In a study from Slovenia, correlations were found between clinical tests and histological analysis of dental pulp in 26 healthy permanent premolars extracted for orthodontic reasons. It was found that a higher density of blood vessels in the pulp tissue corresponded to increased oxygen saturation levels measured through pulse oximetry, lending support to the validity of pulse oximetry as a reliable method for assessing pulp vitality. Furthermore, teeth with closed apices had a higher density of nerve fibers in the upper part of the dental pulp compared to teeth with open apices. This further indicated individual variations in sensitivity, with teeth showing a higher density of nerve fibers having a lower threshold for electrical stimulation.

=== Dual wavelength spectrophotometry ===
The use of dual wavelength light establishes the contents within the pulp chamber. Findings from a 1992 study indicated that continuous wave spectrophotometry could become a useful pulp testing method, after pulpal contents were correctly identified in all twenty of the predetermined conditions within the study.
