= Archives of Oral Biology =

- Discipline: Oral biology, craniofacial science
- Language: English
- Edited by: P. M. Castelo and Oleh Andrukov

Publication details
- History: 1959–present
- Publisher: Elsevier
- Frequency: Monthly
- Impact factor: 2.64 (2021)

Standard abbreviations
- ISO 4: Arch. Oral Biol.

Indexing
- CODEN: AOBIAR
- ISSN: 0003-9969
- OCLC no.: 644502741

Links
- Online access; Journal page at publisher's website

Archives of Oral Biology is a monthly peer-reviewed scientific journal covering oral and craniofacial research in all vertebrates, including work in palaeontology and comparative anatomy. It was established in 1959 and is published by Elsevier. The editors-in-chief are currently Paula M. Castelo and Oleh Andrukov.

== Abstracting and indexing ==
The journal is abstracted and indexed in:

- Abstracts on Hygiene and Communicable Diseases
- Arts and Humanities Citation Index
- BIOSIS Previews
- Biological Abstracts
- CSA Life Sciences Abstracts
- Current Awareness in Biological Sciences
- Current Contents/Life Sciences
- Elsevier BIOBASE
- Global Health
- Science Citation Index
- Index Veterinarius
- MEDLINE/PubMed
- PASCAL
- Scopus
- Veterinary Bulletin
- The Zoological Record

According to the Journal Citation Reports, the journal has a 2012 impact factor of 1.549.
