= Paul Selig =

American playwright, writer, author, educator and psychic

- Born: New York City, New York, U.S.
- Education: Yale University
- Occupations: Playwright, author, educator, psychic

Paul Selig is an American playwright, author, educator and psychic.

== Life and career ==
Selig was born in New York City and received his master’s degree from Yale University. He has taught playwriting at New York University

In 1987, Selig underwent a spiritually related incident and later claimed it gave him the ability of clairvoyance.

In 2016, on the ABC News program Nightline, he discussed working as a psychic relationship advisor with celebrity clients such as former Van Halen front man Sammy Hagar.

In 2018, Forbes magazine included Selig's books I Am the Word, The Book of Knowing and Worth and The Book of Love and Creation in a list of "23 Life-Changing Books You Need to Read, According to Wellness Experts."

Selig wrote the plays Terminal Bar and Mystery School. He wrote the narration for Never Enough by Shapiro and Smith Dance; a dramatic work based on the 1845 book Struwwelpeter which fused dance, music, and the spoken word. In 1987, Selig received a Drama League Playwrights Assistance Award for The Pompeii Travelling Club; a play which was previously developed in 1984 at the San Diego Repertory Theatre. He also wrote the libretto to the chamber opera Three Visitations by composer Kim D. Sherman.
