= Terminal Bar (play) =

- Original language: English
- Written by: Paul Selig
- Characters: Holly; Martinelle; Dwayne; Radio Announcer
- Genre: Post-apocalyptic
- Setting: New York City bar

Premiere
- Date: 1980s
- Place: New York

Terminal Bar is a one-act play by playwright and Yale University alumnus Paul Selig.

The play was featured in the compilation book The Best Short Plays 1988.

== Plot ==
A plague has annihilated civilization yet New York is still standing. Outside of the unseen voice of a radio announcer, the seemingly last people in New York are a Texan woman, a sex worker and a teenage schoolboy holed up inside the ramshackle Terminal Bar.

== Critical reception ==
The New York Times, "To a great extent, style compensates for the familiarity of the subject matter. What the playwright has done is to create three colorful characters facing their demise with differing attitudes."

Los Angeles Times, ""Terminal Bar" is a play that knows how to set us down into a mystery—the character kind, not the genre kind—while not being overly concerned that we find our way out."

The Herald, "Paul Selig successfully couples the wildly imaginative and the bizarre with sensitive perceptions about misconceptions, human frailty, and the desperate desire to be loved.
