= Segmental innervation =

Distribution of a spinal segment's nerves within the body

Segmental innervation refers to the distribution (innervation) of nerves within an organ or muscle. These nerves are attached to a segment of the spine.

Segmental innervation can be mapped through stimulation of the nerve at the spinal segment.
