= Larry Mitchell (author) =

American author and publisher

- Born: July 12, 1938; Muncie, Indiana, United States
- Died: December 26, 2012 (aged 74); Ithaca, New York, United States
- Citizenship: United States
- Writing career
- Language: English
- Genres: Fiction, gay literature

Larry Mitchell (July 12, 1939 – December 26, 2012) was an American author and publisher. He was the founder of Calamus Books - an early small press devoted to gay male literature - and the author of fiction dealing with the gay male experience in New York City during the 1970s and 1980s.

== Biography ==
He was born in Muncie, Indiana, on July 12, 1939, which he described as "a nightmare".

Mitchell attended Colby College and moved to New York City after he graduated in 1960. He received a PhD in Sociology from Columbia University. He worked as a professor at the College of Staten Island, CUNY, where he taught for 25 years.

Mitchell was part of a communal living and writing group in the ST. George neighborhood of Staten Island known as the "25 to 6 Baking and Trucking Society", and found himself the subject of FBI surveillance. He also attended meetings of the Gay Liberation Front in 1969. At that time, he co-edited the book "Willard Waller on The Family, Education and War" with William J. Goode and Frank Furstenberg published in 1970.

In 1977, he wrote The Faggots and Their Friends between Revolutions, but neither straight nor gay presses would publish the book. He established his own press, Calamus Books, to publish it, and the book turned out to be his most successful with three printings and 10,000 copies sold.

With Terry Helbing and Felice Picano, he cofounded Gay Presses of New York in 1981. His book of short stories My Life As a Mole won the 1989 Small Press Lambda Literary Award. Mitchell's novel The Terminal Bar, published in 1982, is considered to be the first book of fiction to address HIV/AIDS. In addition to his own work, he was friends with and collaborated with many prominent gay artists working in New York City in the 1970s and 1980s including William "Bill" Rice, David Wojnarowicz, Peter Hujar and Gary Indiana. The feature film Acid Snow (1998) directed by Joel Itman is based on Mitchell's novel of the same name.

Mitchell stopped writing in 1993, in part due to his increasing blindness and the impact of AIDS on his neighborhood and community. He died on December 26, 2012, in Ithaca, New York, after a battle with pancreatic cancer. He lived with his partner Rick Morrison.

== Works ==
=== Books ===
- Acid Snow (Calamus Books, 1992)
- My Life As A Mole and Five Other Stories (Calamus Books, 1988)
- In Heat: A Romance (Gay Presses of New York, 1986)
- The Terminal Bar (Calamus Books, 1982)
- The Faggots & Their Friends Between Revolutions (Calamus Books, 1977)
- Great Gay in the Morning (with The Lavender Hill Group, Times Change Press, 1972)
- Willard Waller on The Family, Education and War (with William J. Goode and Frank F. Furstenberg, University of Chicago Press, 1970)

=== Plays ===
- Get It While You Can (Presented November 1986 at Theater for the New City, New York City)
- An Evening of Faggot Theater (with The Pink Satin Bomber Collective. Presented March–May 1978 at the Performing Garage, New York City)
