= Terminal Bar (film) =

- Directed by: Stefan Nadelman
- Written by: Orde M. Coombs; Peter Genovese
- Starring: Sheldon Nadelman
- Narrated by: Tom Clifford
- Music by: Michael Reid; Steve Rossiter; Dick Zved
- Distributed by: Cinema16
- Release date: 2003
- Running time: 22 minutes
- Country: United States
- Language: English

Terminal Bar is a 2003 American documentary short film directed by Stefan Nadelman and starring his father Sheldon Nadelman.

A collection of Sheldon Nadelman's Terminal Bar photos used in the film was released in book form in 2014 entitled, Terminal Bar: A Photographic Record of New York's Most Notorious Watering Hole.

== Premise ==
The film is a fast-paced, photo-driven documentary of one of the seediest bars in Times Square, the Terminal Bar, as seen through haunting black-and-white photographs taken by bartender Sheldon Nadelman from 1972 to 1982.

== Critical reception ==
DVD Talk wrote "The genius of Stefan's film, however, is that he doesn't merely present these fascinating images. The piece itself is a multimedia kaleidoscope which combines the photos, Sheldon's stories, text from articles about the bar, an excellent soundtrack and Stefan's virtuoso editing and animation. Each image enters the frame in its own unique way. Sometimes photos break apart into their different components, other times multiple photos join together to create a new image. Stefan's camera pans and zooms around Sheldon's frames, searching for truth and detail. Every element (music, image, voice, background bar sounds) joins together to create a heartbreakingly sad, but still energetic and funny, total."

New York Press said in its review, "Terminal Bar justifies the digital video medium as a means of genuine storytelling and fact-finding—not simply a Hollywood shortcut."

== Terminal Bar film series ==
- Terminal Bar
- Terminal Bar: Pimps and Prostitutes
- Terminal Bar: Porters, Bouncers, and Bartenders
- Terminal Bar: The Garbage Can
- Terminal Bar: Last Call
- Terminal Bar: The End Is Here
