= Terminal Bar (book) =

- First edition
- Author: Sheldon Nadelman; Stefan Nadelman
- Language: English
- Genre: Photography, non-fiction
- Published: October 15, 2014
- Publisher: Princeton Architectural Press
- Publication place: United States
- Pages: 176

Terminal Bar: A Photographic Record of New York's Most Notorious Watering Hole is a 2014 photography book that is a collection of Sheldon Nadelman's photos taken during his ten years spent as a bartender at the Terminal Bar in New York City.

The book was published in 2014 by Princeton Architectural Press.

The book's photos were the subject of a 2002 American documentary short film, Terminal Bar, directed by Sheldon Nadelman's son, Stefan Nadelman that used a combination of animation, live action and black-and-white photography of Terminal Bar's former patrons taken by Sheldon Nadelman, from 1972 to 1982.
