= Stefan Nadelman =

American film director and animator

- Known for: Film Director, Animator, Commercial Director

Stefan Nadelman is an American film director and animator.

A collection of photos from Stefan Nadelman's film Terminal Bar was released in book form in 2014, authored by Nadelman and his father Sheldon Nadelman who also was the book's photographer, entitled, Terminal Bar: A Photographic Record of New York's Most Notorious Watering Hole. Nadelman also directed the animated music video for the song "I Say Fever" by Ramona Falls.

== Short filmography ==
- (2000) Latin Alive
- (2002) Terminal Bar
- (2006) Food Fight
- (2015) Last Call
- (2015) Waveform
