= The Faggots & Their Friends Between Revolutions =

1977 gay manifesto by Larry Mitchell with illustrations by Ned Asta

- Cover of the first edition
- Author: Larry Mitchell
- Illustrator: Ned Asta
- Language: English
- Published: 1977
- Publisher: Calamus Press (First edition); Pocketed Books (2016 reissue); Nightboat Books (2019 reissue)
- Publication place: United States
- ISBN: 978-0930762001
- OCLC: 1109389059
- Dewey Decimal: 301.41/57
- LC Class: HQ76.M57

The Faggots & Their Friends Between Revolutions is a 1977 gay manifesto written by Larry Mitchell as a fable, with illustrations by Ned Asta. The book grew from the author's experience of queer communal living in the 1970s, with particular emphasis on topics of sexual liberation and anti-assimilationism.

== Synopsis ==
Described by Artforum as a "fairytale-cum-manifesto", The Faggots & Their Friends Between Revolutions is a series of allegorical vignettes set in the declining empire of Ramrod, ruled by "the men" (patriarchal society) under the rule of Warren-And-His-Fuckpole, while the eponymous "faggots" (gay men) live communally, produce art, have sex, and await the next revolution. Their "friends" include the "strong women" (feminists), the "queens" (drag queens), the "women who love women" (lesbians), and the "faeries" (the Radical Faeries), among others. Distinct from the faggots are the "queer men" – gay men who are closeted, or who have assimilated into patriarchal society. The book is primarily non-narrative, and is composed largely of a combination of single-page episodes, polemic writing, and aphorisms.

== Background and publication ==
Mitchell was inspired to write The Faggots & Their Friends Between Revolutions following a trip to The Castro in San Francisco in the early 1970s. He based it in part on his experience living in Lavender Hill, a queer commune in Ithaca, New York, that Mitchell and Asta were founding members of. Mitchell conceived of the book in reaction to a lack of contemporary gay literature; he initially planned for The Faggots & Their Friends Between Revolutions to be a children's picture book illustrated by Asta, but it would ultimately become a novel of prose and illustrations.

The novel was first published in 1977 by Calamus Press, founded by Mitchell to self-publish the book after being rejected by other publishers. The book subsequently went out of print, until it was republished twice in the 2010s: first in 2016 by Pocketed Books, and again in 2019 by Nightboat Books to mark the fiftieth anniversary of the Stonewall riots. The 2019 reissue features a new preface by Tourmaline, and an introduction by Morgan Bassichis.

== Adaptations ==
In 2017, a three-part musical adaptation of The Faggots & Their Friends Between Revolutions was staged by Morgan Bassichis at The New Museum.

In 2023, as part of the Manchester International Festival, a musical adaptation by composer Philip Venables and director Ted Huffman was performed. In December 2025, this adaptation will be performed at the Park Avenue Armory in New York City.

In 2025, an adaptation by Hadrien Daigneault-Roy and Sascha Cowan was presented at Berliner Ringtheater

== Reception and legacy ==
Years after its release, the book proliferated through unofficial photocopied (and later PDF) reproductions, and developed a cult following.

Reviewing the 2019 reissue for Slate, critic John Russell comments on the story's contemporary relevance, noting that "the descriptions of Ramrod's disintegration and the men's hostility toward the faggots and their friends are echoed in Trump's America." Regarding the novel's utopian philosophy, Russell writes that he is "of two minds," and expresses discomfort over "what seems to me like Mitchell's ultimate strategy of divestment from the world of the men."

Reviewing the reissue for The Nation, Sam Huber expresses similar skepticism: "when I catch myself trying to force into coherence this book's scattered proposals for another world, I entertain the possibility that I'm reading it wrong [...] It's too weird and protean to serve as a guidebook for ongoing queer struggles or to propel us reliably into a revolution to come." He nonetheless praises the novel's irreverence and continued relevance, stating that its similarities to contemporary politics are "like stumbling into a new room where many of the same actors and problems are reflected but with the fun restored."
