= Terminal bar (histology) =

Details
- Function: Unresolved group of junctional complexes

Terminal bar is a histological term given to the unresolved group of junctional complexes that attach adjacent epithelial cells on their lateral surfaces: the zonula occludens, zonula adherens, macula adherens and macula communicans.

Using light microscopy, the terminal bar appears as a bar or spot at the apical surface of the cell, wherein the structures listed cannot be resolved. With electron microscopy, it can be visually disseminated into these structures.

The terminal bar is located on the lateral surface of epithelial cells, where the lateral surface meets the apical surface. It should not be confused with the terminal web, which is an actinous web underlying microvilli on specialized epithelial cells.
