= Dentinoenamel junction =

Boundary between the enamel and dentin in a tooth

The dentinoenamel junction or dentin-enamel junction (DEJ) is the boundary between the enamel and the underlying dentin that form the solid architecture of a tooth.

It is also known as the amelo-dentinal junction, or ADJ.

The dentinoenamel junction is thought to be of a scalloped structure which has occurred as an exaptation of the epithelial folding that is undergone during ontogeny. This scalloped exaptation has then provided stress relief during mastication and a reduction in dentin-enamel sliding and has thus, not been selected against, making it an accidental adaptation.

== Composition ==
The crown of a human tooth, or more precisely, the tooth's dentin, is coated in enamel. Derived from the mesenchyme, dentin is a mineralised, flexible tissue with a weight percentage of 70% inorganic material, 20% organic material, and 10% fluid. On the other hand, enamel, which comes from epithel, is an extremely brittle tissue that is mainly made up of water (about 3%), trace organic matrix (approximately 1%), and the mineral hydroxyapatite (~96%). The contact between two mineralised tissues with distinct compositions and biomechanical characteristics is known as the dentin-enamel junction (DEJ).

== Structure ==
The dentino-enamel junction is thought to be a scalloped structure, which has occurred as an exaptation of the epithelial folding undergone during ontogeny. This scalloped exaptation has then provided stress relief during mastication and a reduction in dentin-enamel sliding and has, thus, not been selected against, making it an accidental adaptation

== Functions ==
It has been proposed that the DEJ is crucial in preventing the progression of cracks from enamel to dentin and averting additional severe tooth fractures

The dentino-enamel junction is an intricate biomechanical interface that forms the boundary between the highly mineralised enamel and the collagen-rich dentin. Enamel is the hardest tissue in the human body, consisting predominantly of hydroxyapatite crystals. At the same time, dentin is a more flexible tissue with a lower mineral content, providing structural support to enamel. The DEJ plays an essential role in ensuring the integration of these two mechanically different tissues, allowing for the dissipation of stresses during mastication and preventing crack propagation that could otherwise lead to tooth failure.

The molecular structure of the DEJ is designed to accommodate the stark differences in composition and mechanical properties between enamel and dentin. The specialised architecture of the DEJ not only strengthens the bond between these tissues but also distributes mechanical loads in a way that maximises the durability and functionality of the tooth.

== Mechanical role of DEJ in tooth function ==
Primary mechanical role of DEJ is to act as a transitional buffer between enamel and dentin. The molecular architecture of the DEJ ensures that stress concentrations are minimized at the junction, preventing the formation of cracks that could compromise the structural integrity of the tooth.

Cracks formed in the enamel has tendency to not pass through dentin due to existence of DEJ. This crack-stopping ability is largely attributed to the nano-interlocking structures within the DEJ, which dissipate the energy of the crack and prevent it from spreading further. In this way, the DEJ functions as a protective barrier, ensuring the longevity of the tooth under repeated mechanical stress.

== Clinical implications ==
The molecular structure of the DEJ has important clinical implications, particularly in the field of restorative dentistry. Dental restorations, such as crowns and fillings, must be designed to mimic the natural mechanical transition between enamel and dentin. Understanding the molecular architecture of the DEJ can inform the development of advanced biomaterials that better integrate with the remaining tooth structure, improving the success rate and longevity of restorative treatments.
