= Bone canaliculus =

Canal system in bones

Canaliculi in bone osteons
- Diagram of cross-section of bone osteons showing osteocytes and interconnecting canaliculi.

Identifiers
- TH: H2.00.03.7.00003
- FMA: 61923

Bone canaliculi are microscopic canals between the lacunae of ossified bone. The radiating processes of the osteocytes (called filopodia) project into these canals. These cytoplasmic processes are joined together by gap junctions. Osteocytes do not entirely fill up the canaliculi. The remaining space is known as the periosteocytic space, which is filled with periosteocytic fluid. This fluid contains substances too large to be transported through the gap junctions that connect the osteocytes.

In cartilage, the lacunae and hence, the chondrocytes, are isolated from each other. Materials picked up by osteocytes adjacent to blood vessels are distributed throughout the bone matrix via the canaliculi.

Diameter of canaliculi in human bone is approximately 200 to 900 nm. In bovine tibia diameter of canaliculi was found to vary from 155 to 844 nm (average 426 nm). In mice humeri it varies from 80 to 710 nm (average 259 nm), while diameter of osteocytic processes varies from 50 to 410 nm (average 104 nm).

== Dental canaliculi ==
The dental canaliculi (sometimes called dentinal tubules) are the blood supply of a tooth. Odontoblast process run in the canaliculi that transverse the dentin layer and are referred as dentinal tubules. The number and size of the canaliculi decrease as the tubules move away from the pulp and toward the enamel or cementum.

== See also ==
- Lacrimal canaliculi
