= Tooth decay =

Deformation of teeth due to acids produced by bacteria

- Other names: Dental cavities, dental caries, cavities, caries
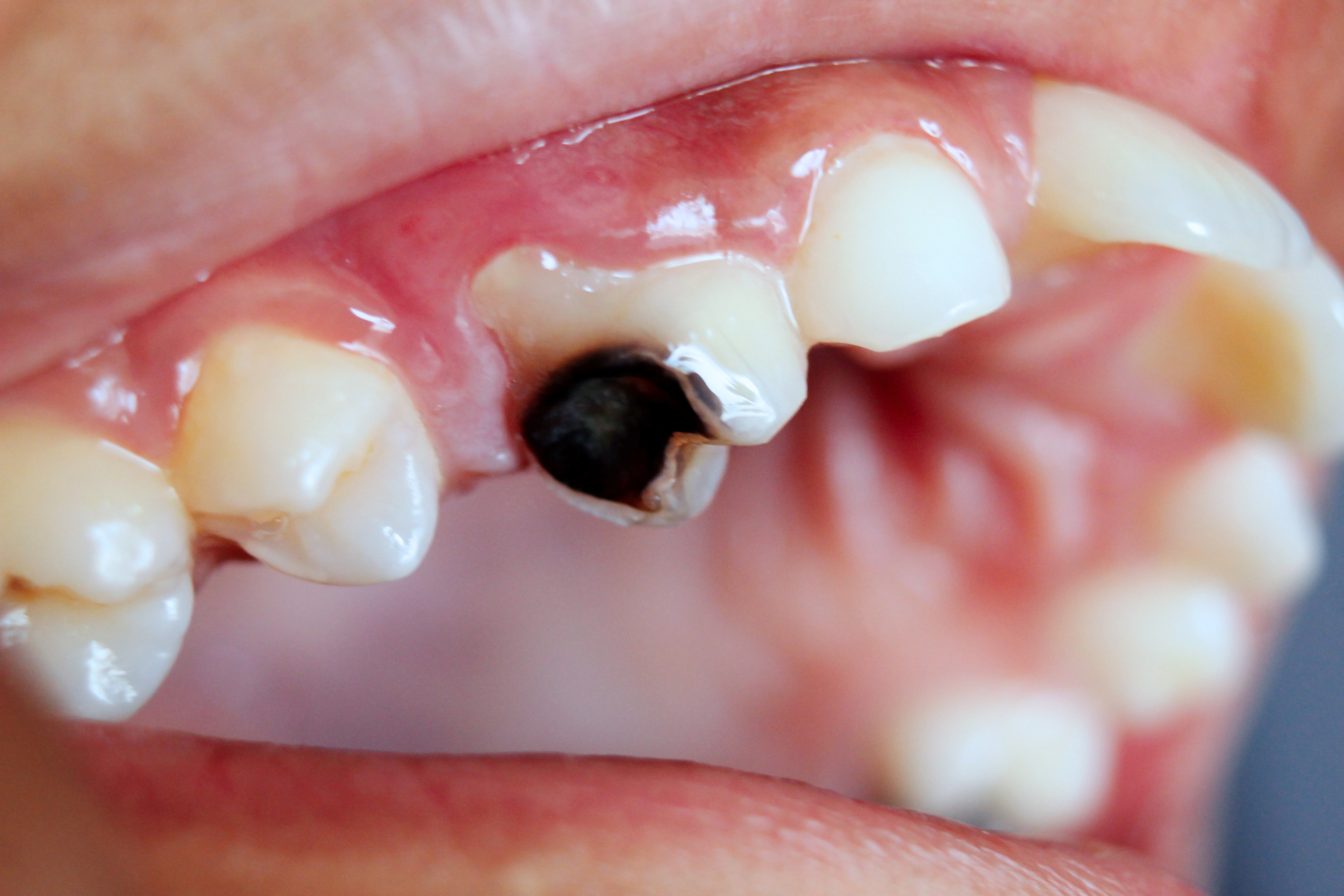
- Destruction of a tooth by dental caries and disease
- Pronunciation: Caries /ˈkɛəriːz/
- Specialty: Dentistry
- Symptoms: Pain, tooth loss, difficulty eating
- Complications: Inflammation around the tooth, tooth loss, infection or abscess formation
- Duration: Long term
- Causes: Bacteria producing acid from food debris
- Risk factors: Diet high in simple sugar, diabetes mellitus, Sjögren syndrome, medications that decrease saliva
- Prevention: Low-sugar diet, tooth brushing, fluoride, dental flossing
- Medication: Paracetamol (acetaminophen), ibuprofen
- Frequency: 3.6 billion (2016)

Tooth decay, also known as caries (lit. 'rottenness', from Latin), (Note: The word 'caries' is a mass noun, and is not a plural of 'carie'.) is the breakdown of teeth due to acids produced by bacteria. The resulting dental cavities may be many different colors, from yellow to black. Symptoms may include pain and difficulty eating. Complications may include periodontal disease (i.e., inflammation of the tissue around the tooth), tooth loss, infection, or dental abscess formation. Tooth regeneration is a field of ongoing stem cell-based study that aims to find methods to reverse the effects of decay; current treatments are limited to symptom management.

The cause of cavities is acid from bacteria dissolving the hard tissues of the teeth (enamel, dentin, and cementum). The acid is produced by the bacteria when they break down food debris or sugar on the tooth surface. Simple sugars in food are these bacteria's primary energy source, and thus a diet high in simple sugar is a risk factor. If tooth demineralization is greater than tooth remineralization from sources such as saliva, caries results. Risk factors include conditions that result in less saliva, such as diabetes mellitus, Sjögren syndrome, and some medications, including psychostimulants, antihistamines, and antidepressants. Dental caries is also associated with poverty, poor oral hygiene, and receding gums, resulting in gingival recession (i.e., exposure of the roots of the teeth).

Prevention of dental caries includes regular teeth cleanings, a low-sugar diet, and small amounts of regular fluoride exposure. Brushing one's teeth twice daily and flossing between the teeth once daily is recommended. Fluoride may be acquired from water, salt, or toothpaste, among other sources. Treating a mother's dental cavities may decrease the risk in her children by decreasing the number of certain bacteria she may spread to them. Screening can result in earlier detection. Depending on the extent of destruction, various treatments can be used to restore the tooth to proper function, or the tooth may be removed. There is no known method to grow back large amounts of tooth. The availability of treatment is often poor in the developing world, according to the World Health Organization. Paracetamol (acetaminophen) or ibuprofen may be taken for pain.

As of 2016, approximately 3.6 billion people (48% of the global population) had dental caries in their permanent teeth. The World Health Organization estimates that nearly all adults have dental caries at some point in time. In baby teeth, it affected about 620 million people, or 9.02% of the global population, in 2010. Bagramian and colleagues reported in 2009 that caries had become more common in both children and adults. The disease is most common in the developed world due to greater simple sugar consumption, but less common in the developing world.

== Signs and symptoms ==
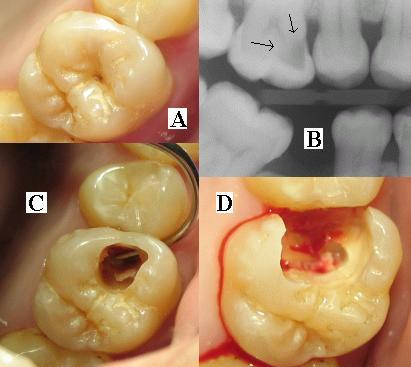
(A) A small spot of decay visible on the surface of a tooth. (B) The radiograph reveals an extensive region of demineralization within the dentin (arrows). (C) A hole is discovered on the side of the tooth at the beginning of decay removal. (D) All decay removed; ready for a filling.

A person experiencing caries may not be aware of the disease. The earliest sign of a new carious lesion is the appearance of a chalky white spot on the surface of the tooth, indicating an area of demineralization of enamel. This is referred to as a white spot lesion, an incipient carious lesion, or a "micro-cavity".

As the lesion continues to demineralize, it can turn brown but will eventually progress into a cavitation ("cavity"). A lesion that appears dark brown and shiny suggests dental caries were once present, but the demineralization process has stopped, leaving a stain. Active decay is lighter in color and appears dull.

As the enamel and dentin are destroyed, the cavity becomes more noticeable. The affected areas of the tooth change color and become soft to the touch. Once the decay passes through the enamel, the dentinal tubules, which have passages to the nerve of the tooth, become exposed, resulting in pain that can be transient, temporarily worsening with exposure to heat, cold, or sweet foods and drinks. A tooth weakened by extensive internal decay can sometimes suddenly fracture under normal chewing forces. When the decay has progressed enough to allow the bacteria to overwhelm the pulp tissue in the center of the tooth, a toothache can result, and the pain will become more constant. Death of the pulp tissue and infection are common consequences. The tooth will no longer be sensitive to hot or cold, but can be quite tender to pressure.

Dental caries can also cause bad breath and foul tastes. In highly progressed cases, an infection can spread from the tooth to the surrounding soft tissues. Complications such as cavernous sinus thrombosis and Ludwig angina can be life-threatening.

== Cause ==
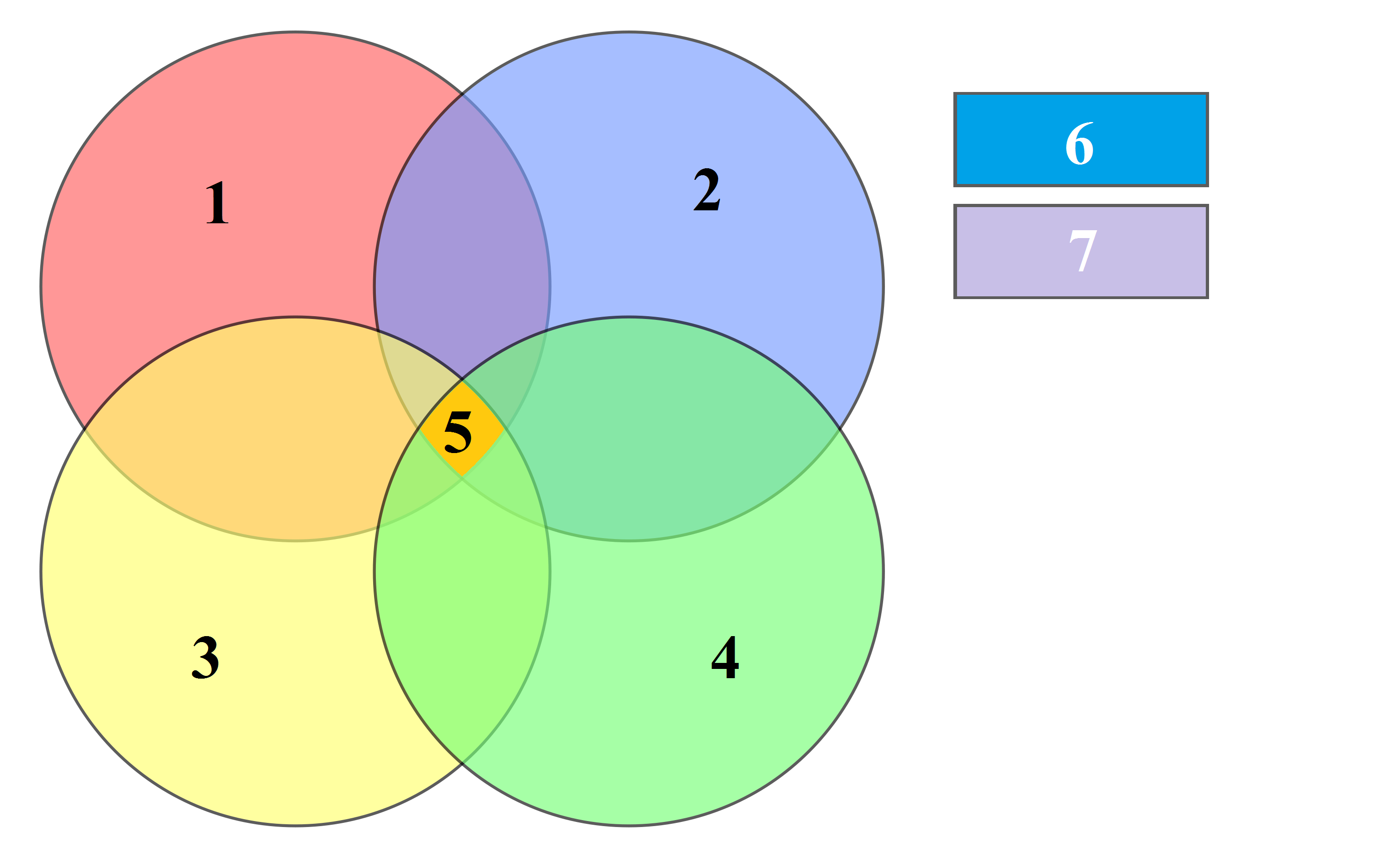
Diagrammatic representation of acidogenic theory of causation of dental caries. Four factors, namely, a suitable carbohydrate substrate (1), micro-organisms in dental plaque (2), a susceptible tooth surface (3) and time (4); must be present together for dental caries to occur (5). Saliva (6) and fluoride (7) are modifying factors.

Four things are required for caries to form: a tooth surface (enamel or dentin), caries-causing bacteria, fermentable carbohydrates (such as sucrose), and time. This involves adherence of food to the teeth and acid creation by the bacteria that makes up the dental plaque. However, these four criteria are not always enough to cause the disease and a sheltered environment promoting development of a cariogenic biofilm is required. The caries disease process does not have an inevitable outcome, and different individuals will be susceptible to different degrees depending on the shape of their teeth, oral hygiene habits, and the buffering capacity of their saliva. Dental caries can occur on any surface of a tooth that is exposed to the oral cavity, but not the structures that are retained within the bone.

Tooth decay is caused by biofilm (dental plaque) lying on the teeth and maturing to become cariogenic (causing decay). Certain bacteria in the biofilm produce acids, primarily lactic acid, in the presence of fermentable carbohydrates such as sucrose, fructose, and glucose.

Caries occur more often in people from the lower end of the socioeconomic scale than in those from a higher socioeconomic background. This is due to a lack of education about dental care and poor access to professional dental care, which may be expensive.

=== Bacteria ===
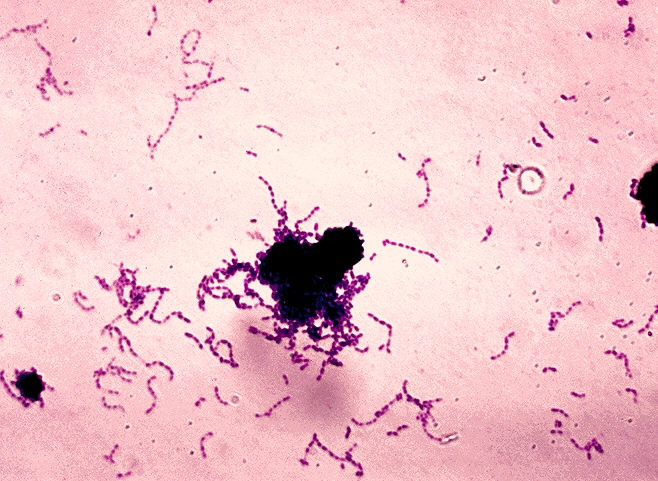
A Gram stain image of Streptococcus mutans

The most common bacteria associated with dental cavities are the mutans streptococci, most prominently Streptococcus mutans and Streptococcus sobrinus, and lactobacilli. However, cariogenic bacteria (the ones that can cause the disease) are present in dental plaque. They are usually in concentrations too low to cause problems unless there is a shift in the balance. This is driven by local environmental change, such as frequent sugar intake or inadequate biofilm removal (toothbrushing). If left untreated, the disease can lead to pain, tooth loss and infection.

The mouth contains a wide variety of oral bacteria. Only a few specific bacterial species are believed to cause dental caries: Streptococcus mutans and Lactobacillus species among them. Streptococcus mutans are gram-positive bacteria that constitute biofilms on the surface of teeth. These organisms can produce high levels of lactic acid following fermentation of dietary sugars and are resistant to the adverse effects of low pH, properties essential for cariogenic bacteria. As the cementum of root surfaces is more easily demineralized than enamel surfaces, a wider variety of bacteria can cause root caries, including Lactobacillus acidophilus, Actinomyces spp., Nocardia spp., and Streptococcus mutans. Bacteria collect around the teeth and gums in a sticky, creamy-coloured mass called plaque, which serves as a biofilm. Some sites collect plaque more commonly than others, for example, sites with a low rate of salivary flow (molar fissures). Grooves on the occlusal surfaces of molar and premolar teeth provide microscopic retention sites for plaque bacteria, as do the interproximal sites. Plaque may also collect above or below the gingiva, where it is referred to as supra- or sub-gingival plaque, respectively.

These bacterial strains, most notably S. mutans, can be transmitted to a child from a caretaker's kiss or through feeding pre-masticated food.

=== Dietary sugars ===
Bacteria in a person's mouth convert glucose, fructose, and most commonly sucrose (table sugar) into acids, mainly lactic acid, through a glycolytic process called fermentation. If left in contact with the tooth, these acids may cause demineralization, which is the dissolution of its mineral content. The process is dynamic, however, as remineralization can also occur if the acid is neutralized by saliva or mouthwash. Fluoride toothpaste or dental varnish may aid remineralization. If demineralization continues over time, enough mineral content may be lost so that the soft organic material left behind disintegrates, forming a cavity or hole. The impact such sugars have on the progress of dental caries is called cariogenicity. Sucrose, although a bound glucose and fructose unit, is more cariogenic than a mixture of equal parts of glucose and fructose. This is due to the bacteria using the energy in the saccharide bond between the glucose and fructose subunits. S.mutans adheres to the biofilm on the tooth by converting sucrose into an extremely adhesive substance called dextran polysaccharide by the enzyme dextran sucranase.

=== Exposure ===
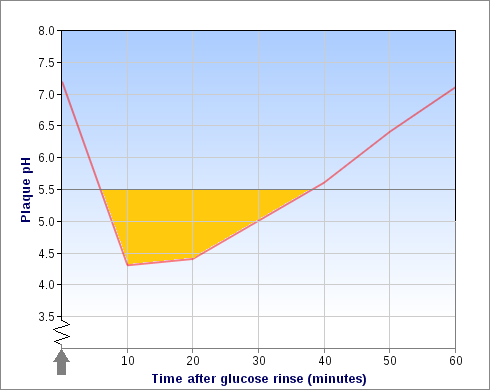
"Stephan curve", showing sudden decrease in plaque pH following glucose rinse, which returns to normal after 30–60 min. Net demineralization of dental hard tissues occurs below the critical pH (5.5), shown in yellow.

The frequency with which teeth are exposed to cariogenic (acidic) environments affects the likelihood of caries development. After meals or snacks, the bacteria in the mouth metabolize sugar, resulting in an acidic by-product that decreases pH. With time, the pH returns to normal due to the buffering capacity of saliva and the dissolved mineral content of tooth surfaces. During every exposure to the acidic environment, portions of the inorganic mineral content at the tooth surface dissolve and can remain dissolved for two hours. Since teeth are vulnerable during these acidic periods, the development of dental caries relies heavily on the frequency of acid exposure.

The carious process can begin within days of a tooth's erupting into the mouth if the diet is sufficiently rich in suitable carbohydrates. Evidence suggests that the introduction of fluoride treatments has slowed the process. Proximal caries take an average of four years to pass through enamel in permanent teeth. Because the cementum enveloping the root surface is not nearly as durable as the enamel encasing the crown, root caries tend to progress much more rapidly than decay on other surfaces. The progression and loss of mineralization on the root surface is 2.5 times faster than caries in enamel. In very severe cases of very poor oral hygiene and when a person's diet is very rich in fermentable carbohydrates, caries may cause cavities within months of tooth eruption. This can occur, for example, when children continuously drink sugary drinks from baby bottles (see later discussion).

=== Teeth ===
Tooth decay

Certain diseases and disorders that affect the teeth may increase an individual's risk for cavities.

Molar incisor hypo-mineralization seems to be increasingly common. While the cause is unknown it is thought to be a combination of genetic and environmental factors. Possible contributing factors that have been investigated include systemic factors such as high levels of dioxins or polychlorinated biphenyl (PCB) in the mother's milk, premature birth and oxygen deprivation at birth, and certain disorders during the child's first 3 years such as mumps, diphtheria, scarlet fever, measles, hypoparathyroidism, malnutrition, malabsorption, hypo-vitaminosis D, chronic respiratory diseases, or undiagnosed and untreated coeliac disease, which usually presents with mild or absent gastrointestinal symptoms.

Amelogenesis imperfecta, which occurs in between 1 in 718 and 1 in 14,000 individuals, is a disease in which the enamel does not fully form or forms in insufficient amounts and can fall off a tooth. In both cases, teeth may be left more vulnerable to decay because the enamel is not able to protect the tooth.

In most people, disorders or diseases affecting teeth are not the primary cause of dental caries. Approximately 96% of tooth enamel is composed of minerals. These minerals, especially hydroxyapatite, will become soluble when exposed to acidic environments. Enamel begins to demineralize at a pH of 5.5. Dentin and cementum are more susceptible to caries than enamel because they have lower mineral content. Thus, when root surfaces of teeth are exposed from gingival recession or periodontal disease, caries can develop more readily. Even in a healthy oral environment, however, the tooth is susceptible to dental caries.

The evidence for linking malocclusion and/or crowding to dental caries is weak; however, the anatomy of teeth may affect the likelihood of caries formation. Where the deep developmental grooves of teeth are more numerous and exaggerated, pit and fissure caries is more likely to develop (see next section). Also, caries is more likely to develop when food is trapped between teeth.

=== Other factors ===
A reduced salivary flow rate is associated with increased caries. This is because the saliva's buffering capability is not present to counterbalance the acidic environment created by certain foods. As a result, medical conditions that reduce the amount of saliva produced by salivary glands, in particular the submandibular gland and parotid gland, are likely to lead to dry mouth and thus to widespread tooth decay. Examples include Sjögren syndrome, diabetes mellitus, diabetes insipidus, and sarcoidosis. Medications, such as antihistamines and antidepressants, can also impair salivary flow.

Stimulants, most notoriously methylamphetamine, also occlude the flow of saliva to an extreme degree. This is known as meth mouth. Tetrahydrocannabinol (THC), the active chemical substance in cannabis, also causes a nearly complete occlusion of salivation, known in colloquial terms as "cotton mouth". Moreover, 63% of the most commonly prescribed medications in the United States list dry mouth as a known side effect. Radiation therapy of the head and neck may also damage the cells in salivary glands, somewhat increasing the likelihood of caries formation.

Susceptibility to caries can be related to altered metabolism in the tooth, in particular to fluid flow in the dentin. Experiments on rats have shown that a high-sucrose, cariogenic diet "significantly suppresses the rate of fluid motion" in dentin.

The use of tobacco may also increase the risk for caries formation. Some brands of smokeless tobacco contain high sugar content, increasing susceptibility to caries. Tobacco use is a significant risk factor for periodontal disease, which can cause the gingiva to recede. As the gingiva loses attachment to the teeth due to gingival recession, the root surface becomes more visible in the mouth. If this occurs, root caries is a concern since the cementum covering the roots of teeth is more easily demineralized by acids than enamel. Currently, there is not enough evidence to support a causal relationship between smoking and coronal caries, but evidence does suggest a relationship between smoking and root-surface caries. Exposure of children to secondhand tobacco smoke is associated with tooth decay.

Intrauterine and neonatal lead exposure promote tooth decay. Besides lead, all atoms with electrical charge and ionic radius similar to bivalent calcium, such as cadmium, mimic the calcium ion, and therefore exposure to them may promote tooth decay.

Poverty is also a significant social determinant for oral health. Dental caries have been linked with lower socio-economic status and can be considered a disease of poverty.

Forms are available for risk assessment for caries when treating dental cases; this system uses the evidence-based Caries Management by Risk Assessment (CAMBRA). It is unknown if identifying high-risk individuals leads to more effective long-term patient management that prevents caries initiation and arrests or reverses lesion progression.

Saliva also contains iodine and EGF. EGF results are effective in cellular proliferation, differentiation, and survival. Salivary EGF, which seems also regulated by dietary inorganic iodine, plays an important physiological role in the maintenance of oral (and gastro-oesophageal) tissue integrity, and, on the other hand, iodine is effective in the prevention of dental caries and oral health.

== Pathophysiology ==
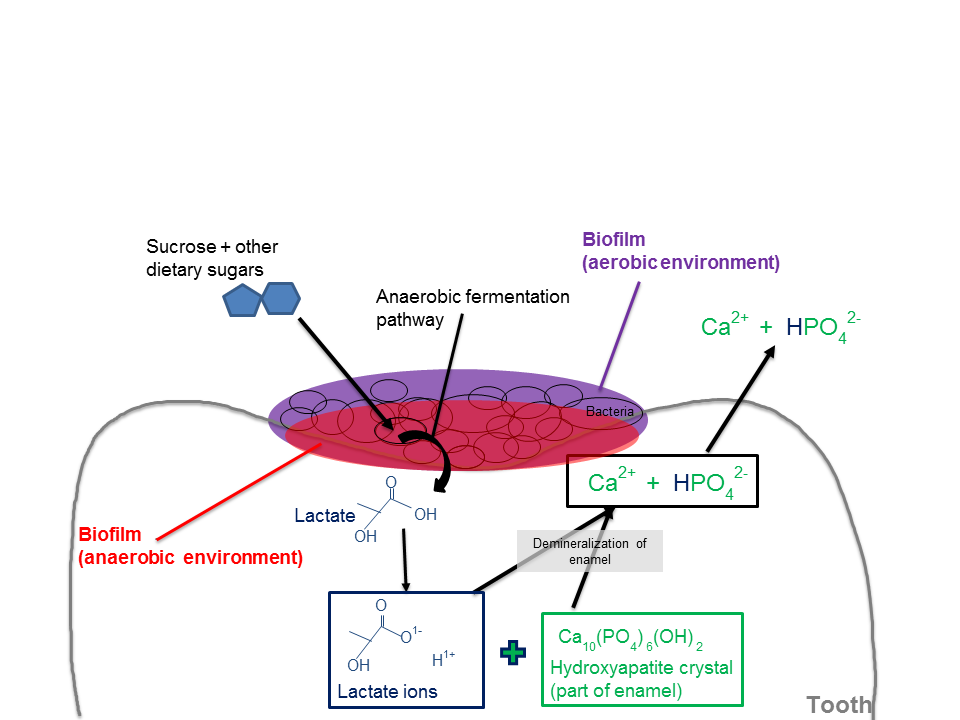
Microbe communities attach to tooth surface and create a biofilm. As the biofilm grows, an anaerobic environment forms from the oxygen being used. Microbes use sucrose and other dietary sugars as a food source. Anaerobic fermentation metabolizes dietary sugars and produces lactate. The lactate is excreted from the cell onto the tooth enamel, then ionizes. The lactate ions demineralize the hydroxyapatite crystals, causing the tooth to degrade.

The progression of pit and fissure caries resembles two triangles with their bases meeting along the junction of enamel and dentin.

Teeth are bathed in saliva and have a coating of bacteria on them (biofilm) that continually forms. Biofilm development begins with pellicle formation. Pellicle is an acellular proteinaceous film that covers the teeth. Bacteria colonize the teeth by adhering to the pellicle-coated surface. Over time, a mature biofilm is formed, creating a cariogenic environment on the tooth surface.

The minerals in the hard tissues of the teeth – enamel, dentin, and cementum – are constantly undergoing demineralization and remineralization. Dental caries result when the demineralization rate is faster than the remineralization, producing net mineral loss, which occurs when there is an ecologic shift within the dental biofilm from a balanced population of microorganisms to a population that produces acids and can survive in an acid environment.

=== Enamel ===
Tooth enamel is a highly mineralized acellular tissue, and caries act upon it through a chemical process brought on by the acidic environment produced by bacteria. As the bacteria consume the sugar and use it for their own energy, they produce lactic acid. The effects of this process include the demineralization of crystals in the enamel, caused by acids, over time, until the bacteria physically penetrate the dentin. Enamel rods, which are the basic unit of the enamel structure, run perpendicularly from the surface of the tooth to the dentin. Since demineralization of enamel by caries follows the direction of the enamel rods, the different triangular patterns between pit and fissure and smooth-surface caries develop in the enamel because the orientation of enamel rods is different in the two areas of the tooth.

As the enamel loses minerals, and dental caries progresses, the enamel develops several distinct zones, visible under a light microscope. From the deepest layer of the enamel to the enamel surface, the identified areas are the translucent zone, dark zones, body of the lesion, and surface zone. The translucent zone is the first visible sign of caries and coincides with a one to two percent loss of minerals. A slight remineralization of enamel occurs in the dark zone, which serves as an example of how the development of dental caries is an active process with alternating changes. The area of greatest demineralization and destruction is in the body of the lesion itself. The surface zone remains relatively mineralized until the loss of tooth structure results in a cavitation.

=== Dentin ===
Unlike enamel, the dentin reacts to the progression of dental caries. After tooth formation, the ameloblasts, which produce enamel, are destroyed once enamel formation is complete and thus cannot later regenerate enamel after its destruction. On the other hand, dentin is produced continuously throughout life by odontoblasts, which reside at the border between the pulp and dentin. Since odontoblasts are present, a stimulus, such as caries, can trigger a biological response. These defense mechanisms include the formation of sclerotic and tertiary dentin.

In dentin, from the deepest layer to the enamel, the distinct areas affected by caries are the advancing front, the zone of bacterial penetration, and the zone of destruction. The advancing front represents a zone of demineralized dentin due to acid and has no bacteria present. The zones of bacterial penetration and destruction are the locations of invading bacteria and ultimately dentin decomposition. The zone of destruction has a more mixed bacterial population where proteolytic enzymes have destroyed the organic matrix. The innermost dentin caries has been reversibly attacked because the collagen matrix is not severely damaged, giving it potential for repair.

The faster spread of caries through dentin creates this triangular appearance in smooth surface caries.

==== Sclerotic dentin ====
The structure of dentin is an arrangement of microscopic channels, called dentinal tubules, which radiate outward from the pulp chamber to the exterior cementum or enamel border. The diameter of the dentinal tubules is largest near the pulp (about 2.5 μm) and smallest (about 900 nm) at the junction of dentin and enamel. The carious process continues through the dentinal tubules, which are responsible for the triangular patterns resulting from the progression of caries deep into the tooth. The tubules also allow caries to progress faster.

In response, the fluid inside the tubules brings immunoglobulins from the immune system to fight the bacterial infection. At the same time, there is an increase in mineralization of the surrounding tubules. This results in a constriction of the tubules, which is an attempt to slow the bacterial progression. In addition, as the acid from the bacteria demineralizes the hydroxyapatite crystals, calcium and phosphorus are released, allowing for the precipitation of more crystals which fall deeper into the dentinal tubule. These crystals form a barrier and slow the advancement of caries. After these protective responses, the dentin is considered sclerotic.

According to hydrodynamic theory, fluids within dentinal tubules are believed to be the mechanism by which pain receptors are triggered within the pulp of the tooth. Since sclerotic dentin prevents the passage of such fluids, pain that would otherwise serve as a warning of the invading bacteria may not develop at first.

==== Tertiary dentin ====
In response to dental caries, there may be production of more dentin in the direction of the pulp. This new dentin is referred to as tertiary dentin. Tertiary dentin is produced to protect the pulp for as long as possible from the advancing bacteria. As more tertiary dentin is produced, the size of the pulp decreases. This type of dentin has been subdivided according to the presence or absence of the original odontoblasts. If the odontoblasts survive long enough to react to the dental caries, then the dentin produced is called "reactionary" dentin. If the odontoblasts are killed, the dentin produced is known as "reparative" dentin.

In the case of reparative dentin, other cells must assume the role of the destroyed odontoblasts. Growth factors, especially TGF-β, are thought to initiate the production of reparative dentin by fibroblasts and mesenchymal cells of the pulp. Reparative dentin is produced at an average of 1.5 μm/day, but can be increased to 3.5 μm/day. The resulting dentin contains irregularly shaped dentinal tubules that may not line up with existing dentinal tubules. This diminishes the ability for dental caries to progress within the dentinal tubules.

=== Cementum ===
The incidence of cemental caries increases in older adults as gingival recession occurs from either trauma or periodontal disease. It is a chronic condition that forms a large, shallow lesion and slowly invades the root's cementum and then dentin, causing a chronic pulp infection (see further discussion under classification by affected hard tissue). Because dental pain is a late finding, many early lesions remain undetected, leading to restorative challenges and increased tooth loss.

== Diagnosis ==
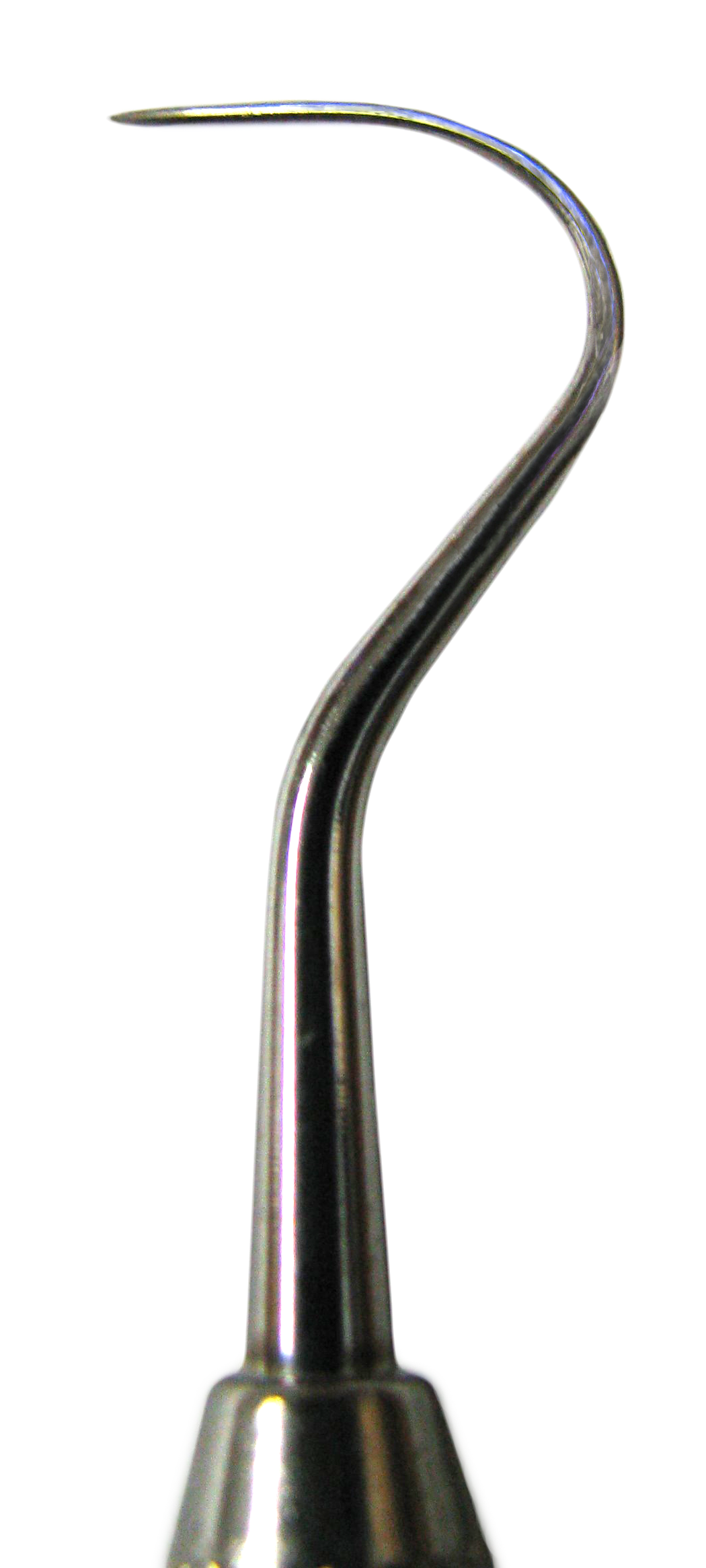
The tip of a dental explorer, which is used for caries diagnosis

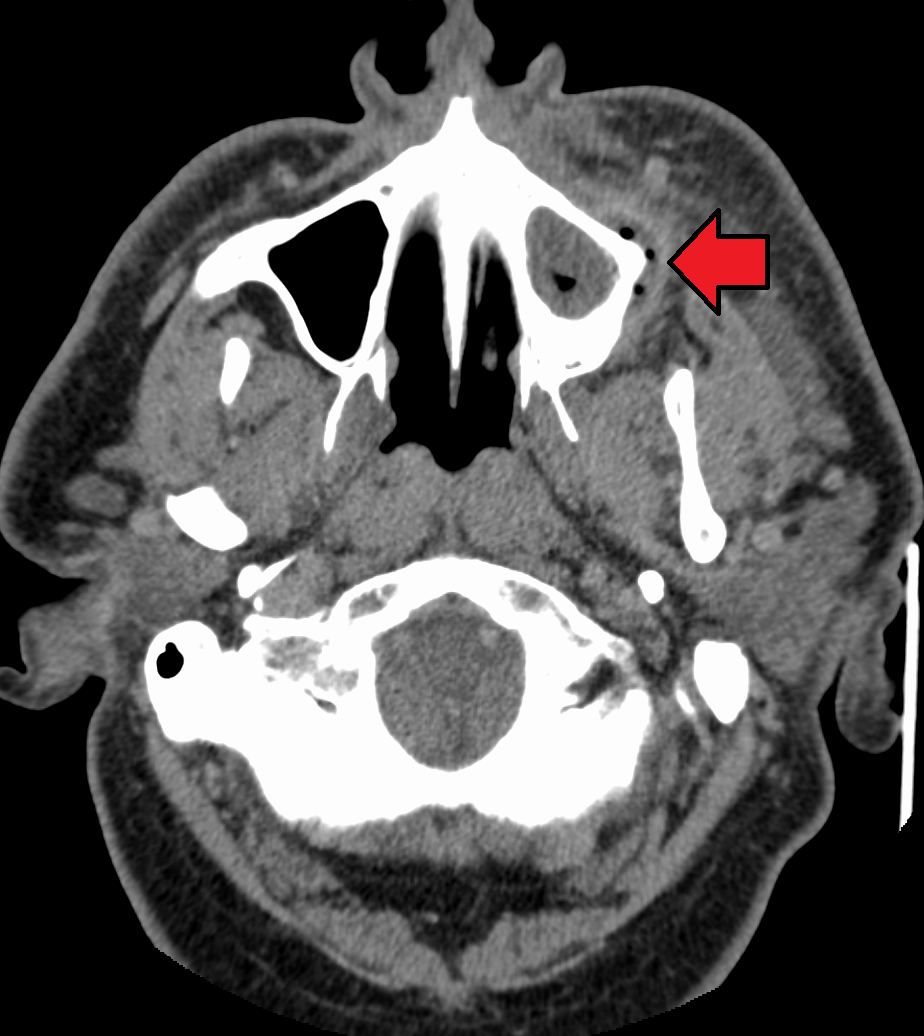
A dental infection resulting in an abscess and inflammation of the maxillary sinus

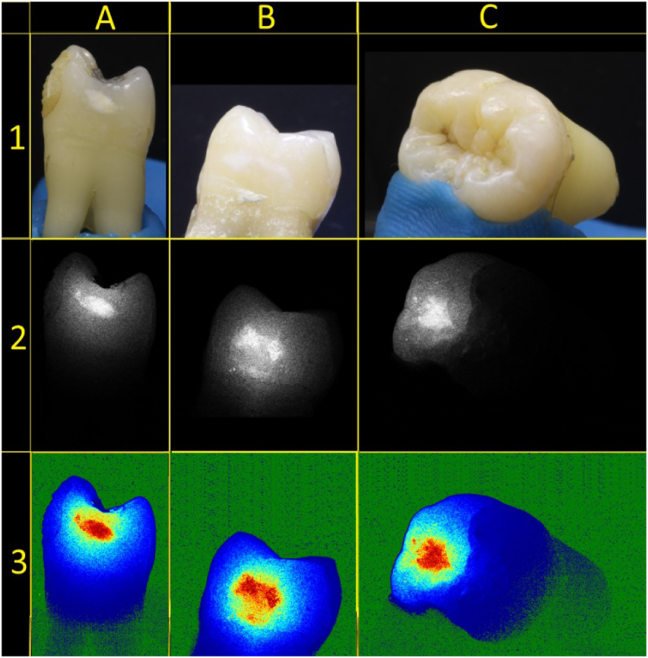
Tooth samples imaged with a non-coherent continuous light source (row 1), LSI (row 2), and pseudo-color visualization of LSI (row 3)

The presentation of caries is highly variable. However, the risk factors and stages of development are similar. Initially, it may appear as a small chalky area (smooth surface caries), which may eventually develop into a large cavity. Sometimes caries may be directly visible. However, other methods of detection, such as X-rays, are used for less visible areas of teeth and to judge the extent of destruction. Lasers for detecting caries allow detection without ionizing radiation and are now used to detect interproximal decay (between the teeth).

Primary diagnosis involves inspection of all visible tooth surfaces using a good light source, dental mirror, and explorer. Dental radiographs (X-rays) may show dental caries before it is otherwise visible, in particular caries between the teeth. Large areas of dental caries are often apparent to the naked eye, but smaller lesions can be difficult to identify. Visual and tactile inspection, along with radiographs, are used frequently by dentists, in particular to diagnose pit and fissure caries. Early, uncavitated caries is often diagnosed by blowing air across the suspect surface, which removes moisture and changes the optical properties of the unmineralized enamel.

Some dental researchers have cautioned against the use of dental explorers to find caries, in particular sharp ended explorers. In cases where a small area of tooth has begun demineralizing but has not yet cavitated, the pressure from the dental explorer could cause a cavity. Since the carious process is reversible before a cavity is present, it may be possible to arrest caries with fluoride and remineralize the tooth surface. When a cavity is present, a restoration will be needed to replace the lost tooth structure.

At times, pit and fissure caries may be difficult to detect. Bacteria can penetrate the enamel to reach dentin, but then the outer surface may remineralize, especially if fluoride is present. These caries, sometimes referred to as "hidden caries", will still be visible on X-ray radiographs, but visual examination of the tooth would show the enamel intact or minimally perforated.

The differential diagnosis for dental caries includes dental fluorosis and developmental defects of the tooth, including hypomineralization of the tooth and hypoplasia of the tooth.

The early carious lesion is characterized by demineralization of the tooth surface, altering the tooth's optical properties. Technology using laser speckle image (LSI) techniques may provide a diagnostic aid to detect early carious lesions.

=== Classification ===
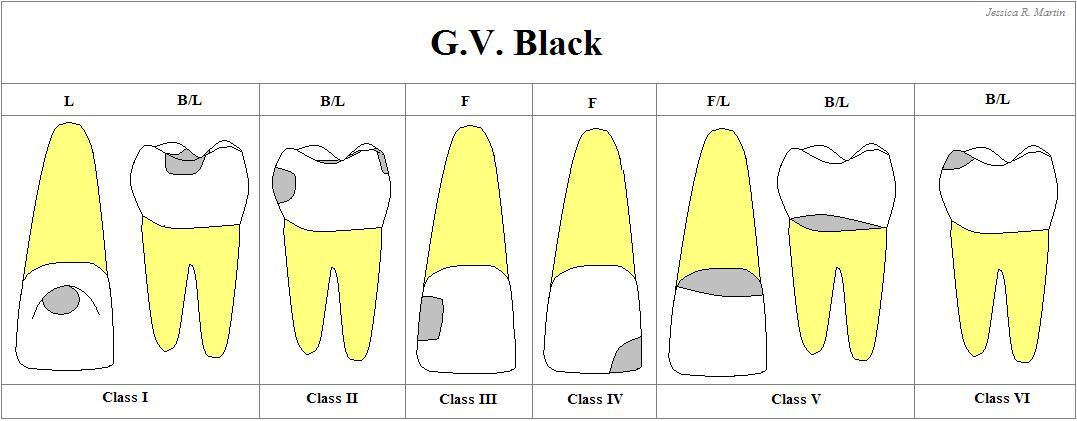
G. V. Black Classification of Restorations

Caries can be classified by location, etiology, rate of progression, and affected hard tissues. These forms of classification can be used to characterize a particular case of tooth decay to more accurately represent the condition to others and also indicate the severity of tooth destruction. In some instances, caries is described in other ways that might indicate the cause. The G. V. Black classification is as follows:

- Class I: occlusal surfaces of posterior teeth, buccal or lingual pits on molars, lingual pit near cingulum of maxillary incisors
- Class II: proximal surfaces of posterior teeth
- Class III: interproximal surfaces of anterior teeth without incisal edge involvement
- Class IV: interproximal surfaces of anterior teeth with incisal edge involvement
- Class V: cervical third of the facial or lingual surface of the tooth
- Class VI: incisal or occlusal edge is worn away due to attrition

=== Early childhood caries ===
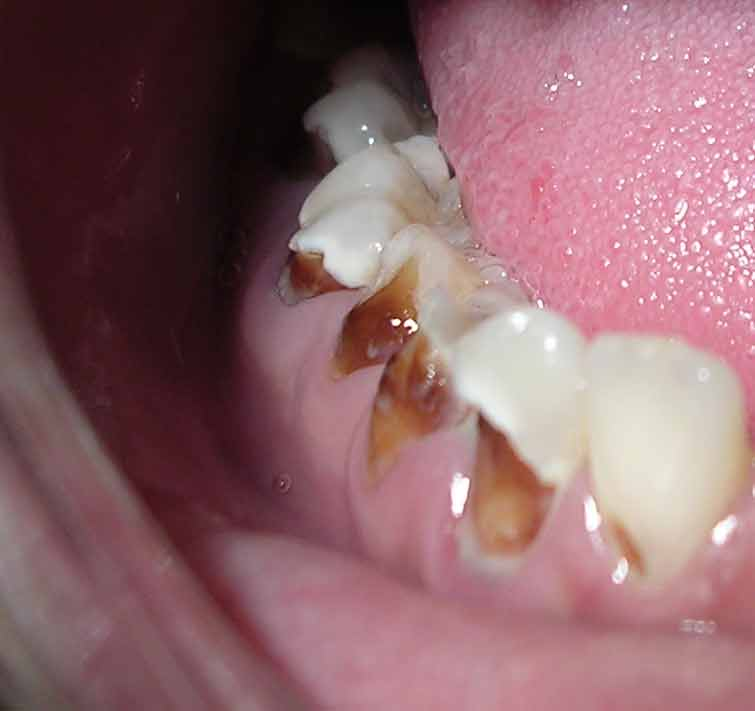
Rampant caries caused by methamphetamine abuse

Early childhood caries (ECC), also known as "baby bottle caries," "baby bottle tooth decay" or "bottle rot," is a pattern of decay found in young children with their deciduous (baby) teeth. This must include the presence of at least one carious lesion on a primary tooth in a child under the age of six. The teeth most likely affected are the maxillary anterior teeth, but all teeth can be affected. The name for this type of caries comes from the fact that the decay usually is a result of allowing children to fall asleep with sweetened liquids in their bottles or feeding children sweetened liquids multiple times during the day.

Another pattern of decay is "rampant caries", which signifies advanced or severe decay on multiple surfaces of many teeth. Rampant caries may be seen in individuals with xerostomia, poor oral hygiene, stimulant use (due to drug-induced dry mouth), and/or large sugar intake. If rampant caries is a result of previous radiation to the head and neck, it may be described as radiation-induced caries. Problems can also be caused by the self-destruction of roots and whole tooth resorption when new teeth erupt or later from unknown causes.

Children between 6 and 12 months are at increased risk of developing dental caries.

A range of studies have reported a correlation between caries in primary teeth and caries in permanent teeth.

=== Rate of progression ===
Temporal descriptions can be applied to caries to indicate the progression rate and previous history. "Acute" signifies a quickly developing condition, whereas "chronic" describes a condition that has taken an extended time to develop, in which thousands of meals and snacks, many causing some acid demineralization that is not remineralized, eventually result in cavities.

Recurrent caries, also known as secondary caries, are caries that appear at a location with a previous history of caries. This is frequently found on the margins of fillings and other dental restorations. On the other hand, incipient caries describes decay at a location that has not experienced previous decay. Arrested caries are lesions on a tooth that were previously demineralized but were remineralized before causing a cavitation. Fluoride treatment can help recalcification of tooth enamel, as well as the use of amorphous calcium phosphate.

Micro-invasive interventions (such as dental sealant or resin infiltration) have been shown to slow down the progression of proximal decay.

=== Affected hard tissue ===
Depending on which hard tissues are affected, caries can be described as involving enamel, dentin, or cementum. Early in its development, caries may affect only enamel. Once the extent of decay reaches the deeper layer of dentin, the term "dentinal caries" is used. Since cementum is the hard tissue that covers the roots of teeth, it is not often affected by decay unless the roots of teeth are exposed to the mouth. Although the term "cementum caries" may be used to describe the decay on the roots of teeth, very rarely does caries affect the cementum alone.

== Prevention ==
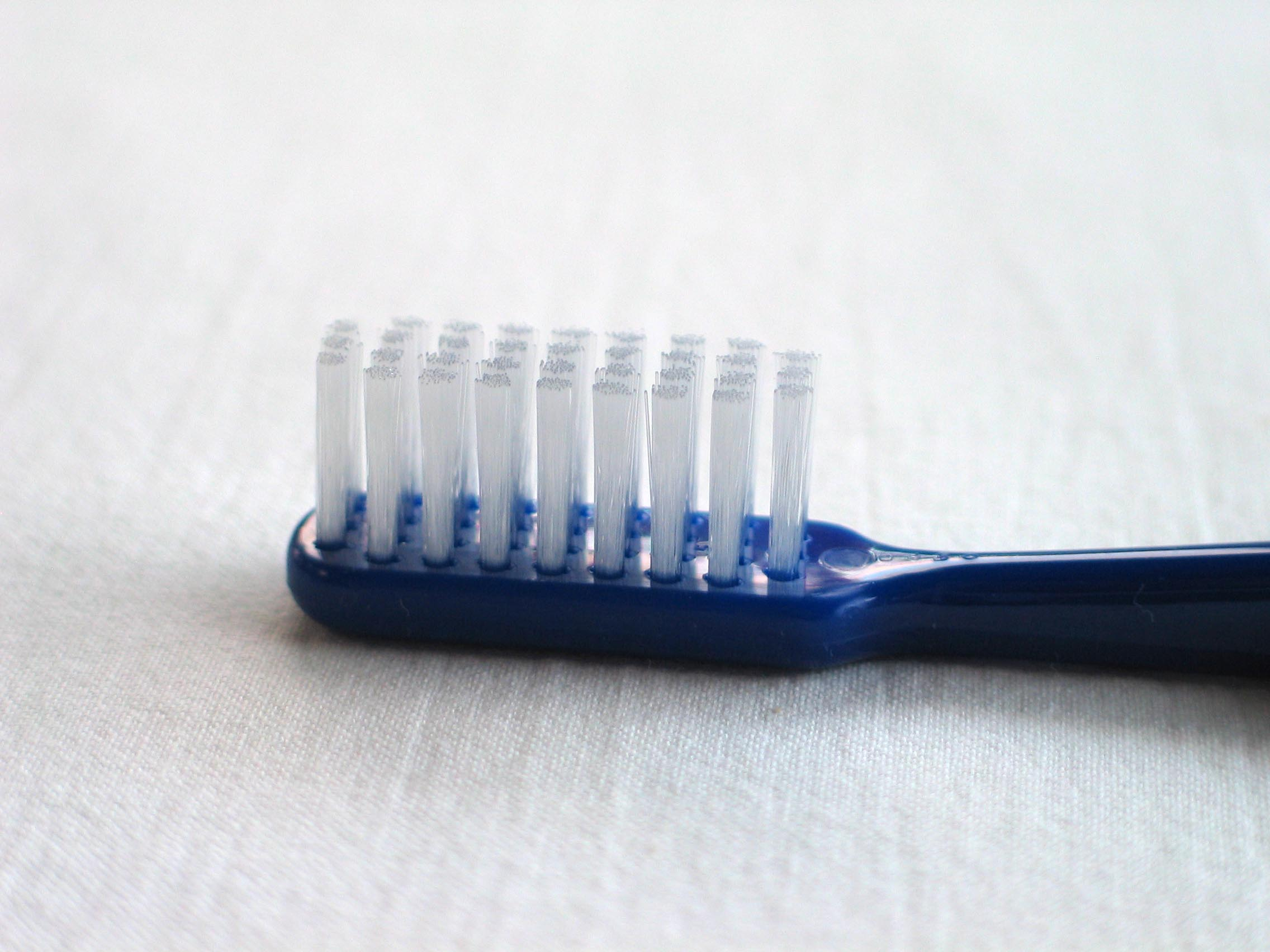
Toothbrushes are commonly used to clean teeth.

=== Oral hygiene ===
The primary approach to dental hygiene care consists of tooth-brushing and flossing. The purpose of oral hygiene is to remove and prevent the formation of plaque or dental biofilm, although studies have shown this effect on caries is limited. While there is no evidence that flossing prevents tooth decay, the practice is still generally recommended.

A toothbrush can be used to remove plaque on accessible surfaces, but not between teeth or inside pits and fissures on chewing surfaces. When used correctly, dental floss removes plaque from areas that could otherwise develop proximal caries, but only if the depth of sulcus has not been compromised. Additional aids include interdental brushes, water picks, and mouthwashes. The use of rotational electric toothbrushes may reduce the risk of plaque and gingivitis, though it is unclear whether they are clinically important.

However, oral hygiene is effective at preventing gum disease (gingivitis / periodontal disease). Food is forced into pits and fissures under chewing pressure, leading to carbohydrate-fuelled acid demineralisation where the brush, fluoride or hydroxyapatite toothpastes, and saliva have no access to remove trapped food, neutralize acid, or remineralise tooth enamel. (Occlusal caries accounts for between 80 and 90% of caries in children (Weintraub, 2001).) Unlike brushing, fluoride reduces caries incidence by approximately 25%; higher concentrations of fluoride (>1,000 ppm) in toothpaste also help prevent tooth decay, with the effect increasing with concentration up to a plateau. A randomized clinical trial demonstrated that toothpastes that contain arginine have greater protection against tooth cavitation than the regular fluoride toothpastes containing 1450 ppm alone. A Cochrane review has confirmed that the use of fluoride gels, normally applied by a dental professional from once to several times a year, assists in the prevention of tooth decay in children and adolescents, reiterating the importance of fluoride as the principal means of caries prevention. Another review concluded that the supervised regular use of a fluoride mouthwash greatly reduced the onset of decay in the permanent teeth of children.

Professional hygiene care consists of regular dental examinations and professional prophylaxis (cleaning). Sometimes, complete plaque removal is difficult, and a dentist or dental hygienist may be needed. Along with oral hygiene, radiographs may be taken at dental visits to detect possible dental caries development in high-risk areas of the mouth (e.g., "bitewing" X-rays, which visualize the crowns of the back teeth).

Alternative methods of oral hygiene also exist around the world, such as the use of teeth cleaning twigs, such as miswaks in some Middle Eastern and African cultures. There is some limited evidence demonstrating the efficacy of these alternative methods of oral hygiene.

=== Dietary modification ===
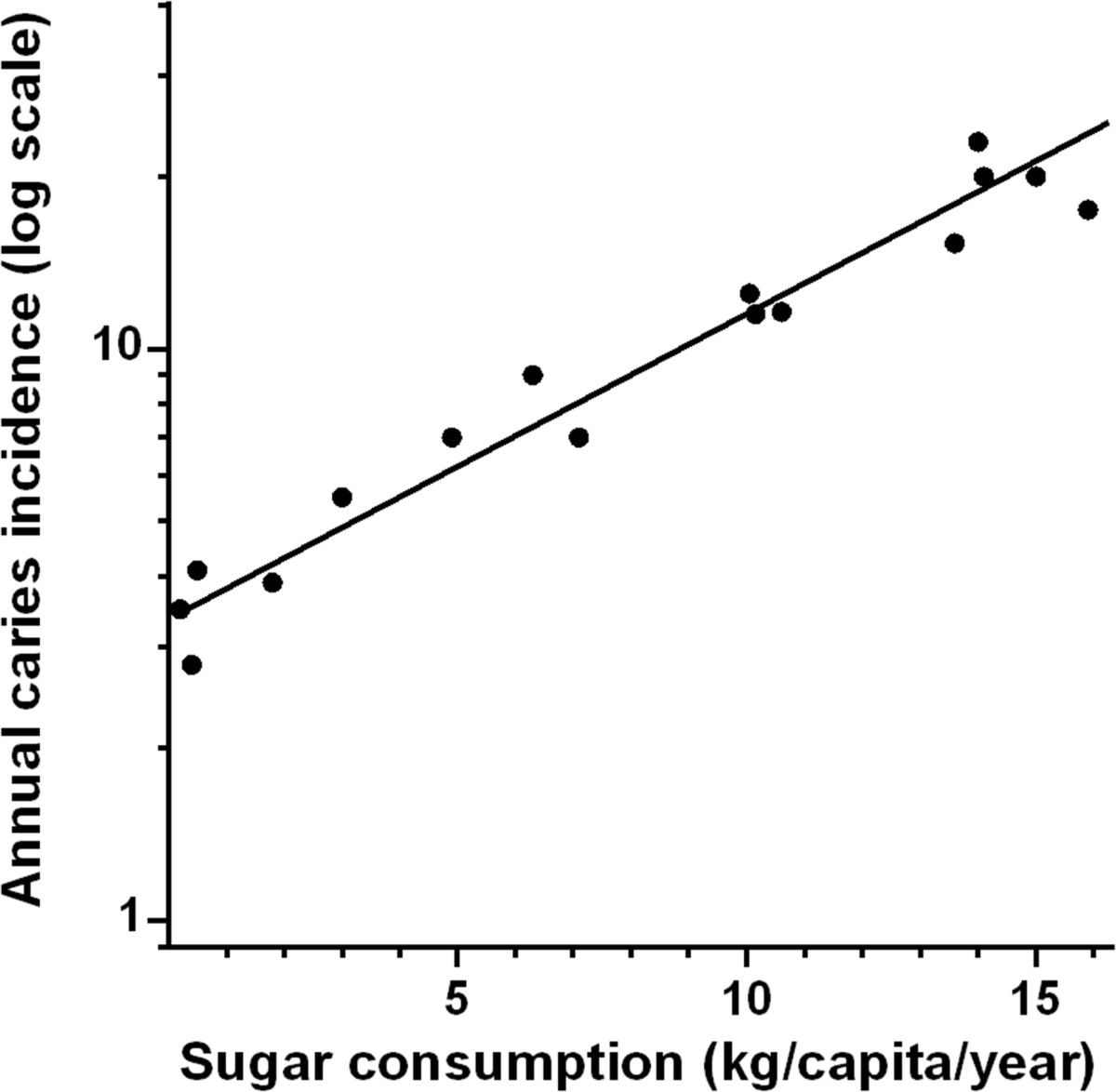
Annual caries incidence increases exponentially with annual per capita sugar consumption. Data based on 10,553 Japanese children whose individual lower first molars were monitored yearly from ages 6 to 11 years. Caries plotted on a logarithmic scale, so line is straight.

People who eat more free sugars get more cavities, with cavities increasing exponentially with increasing sugar intake. Populations with less sugar intake have fewer cavities. In one population, in Nigeria, where sugar consumption was about 2g/day, only two percent of the population, of any age, had had a cavity.

Chewy and sticky foods (such as candy, cookies, potato chips, and crackers) tend to adhere to teeth for longer periods. However, dried fruits such as raisins and fresh fruits such as apples and bananas disappear from the mouth quickly and do not appear to be a risk factor. Consumers are not good at assessing which foods remain in the mouth.

For children, the American Dental Association and the European Academy of Paediatric Dentistry recommend limiting the frequency of sugar-sweetened beverage consumption and not giving baby bottles during sleep (see earlier discussion). Parents are also recommended to avoid sharing utensils and cups with their infants to prevent transferring bacteria from the parent's mouth.

Xylitol is a naturally occurring sugar alcohol that is used in different products as an alternative to sucrose (table sugar). As of 2015, the evidence concerning the use of xylitol in chewing gum was insufficient to determine if it is effective at preventing caries.

=== Other measures ===
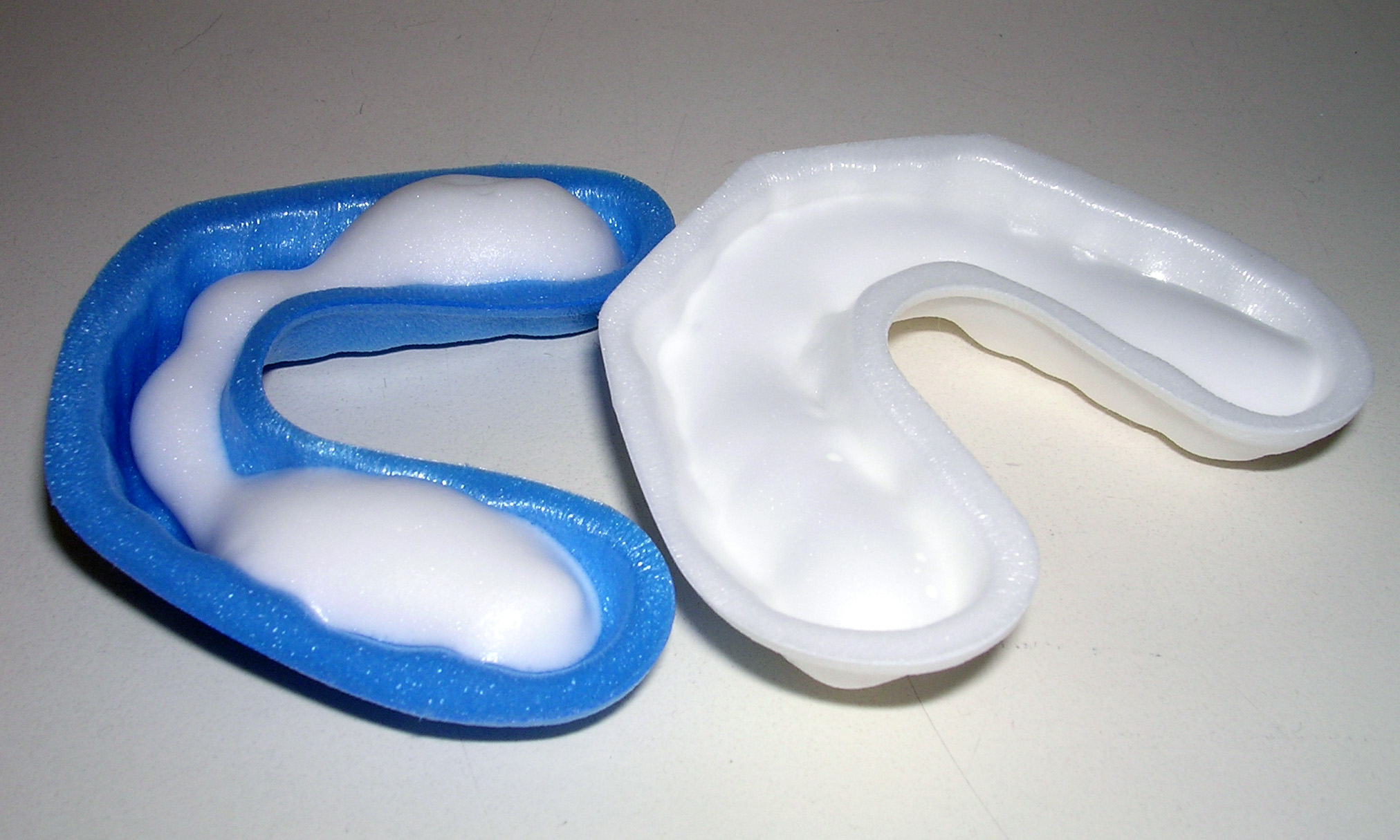
Common dentistry trays used to deliver fluoride

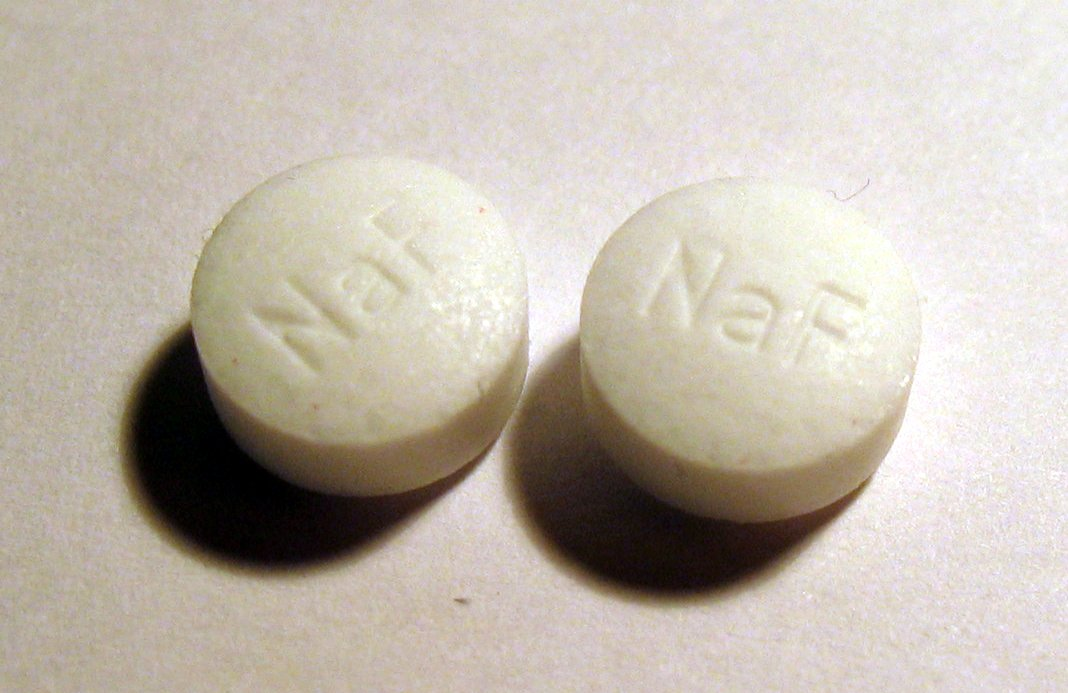
Fluoride is sold in tablets for cavity prevention.

The use of dental sealants is a prevention technique. A sealant is a thin plastic-like coating applied to the chewing surfaces of the molars to prevent food from being trapped inside pits and fissures. This deprives resident plaque bacteria of carbohydrates, preventing the formation of pit-and-fissure caries. Sealants are usually applied to children's teeth as soon as the teeth erupt, but adults also receive them if they were not previously done. Sealants can wear out and fail to prevent food and plaque bacteria from entering pits and fissures, and must be replaced. Therefore, they must be checked regularly by dental professionals. Dental sealants are more effective at preventing occlusal decay compared to fluoride varnish applications.

Calcium, found in foods such as milk and green vegetables, is often recommended to protect against dental caries. Fluoride helps prevent decay of a tooth by binding to the hydroxyapatite crystals in enamel. Streptococcus mutans is the leading cause of tooth decay. Low-concentration fluoride ions act as a bacteriostatic therapeutic agent. High-concentration fluoride ions are bactericidal. The incorporated fluorine makes enamel more resistant to demineralization and, thus, resistant to decay. Fluoride can be found in either topical or systemic form. Topical fluoride is more highly recommended than systemic intake to protect the surface of the teeth. Topical fluoride is used in toothpaste, mouthwash and fluoride varnish. Standard fluoride toothpaste (1,000–1,500 ppm) is more effective than low fluoride toothpaste (< 600ppm) to prevent dental caries.

It is recommended that all adult patients use fluoridated toothpaste with at least 1350ppm fluoride content, brushing at least 2 times per day, and brushing right before bed. For children and young adults, use fluoridated toothpaste with 1350ppm to 1500ppm fluoride content, brushing 2 times per day, and brushing right before bed. The American Dental Association Council recommends that for children under 3 years old, caregivers begin brushing their teeth with no more than a smear of fluoridated toothpaste. Supervised toothbrushing must also be performed for children below 8 years of age to prevent swallowing of toothpaste. After brushing with fluoride toothpaste, rinsing should be avoided and the excess spat out. Many dental professionals include application of topical fluoride solutions as part of routine visits and recommend the use of xylitol and amorphous calcium phosphate products.

Silver diammine fluoride may work better than fluoride varnish to prevent cavities. Systemic fluoride is found as lozenges, tablets, drops and water fluoridation. These are ingested orally to provide fluoride systemically.

Water fluoridation is beneficial in preventing tooth decay, especially in low socioeconomic areas, where other forms of fluoride are not available.

A Cochrane systematic review found no evidence that taking fluoride systemically daily in pregnant women was effective in preventing dental decay in their offspring.

While some products containing chlorhexidine have been shown to limit the progression of existing tooth decay, there is currently no evidence suggesting that chlorhexidine gels and varnishes can prevent dental caries or reduce the population of Streptococcus mutans in the mouth.

An oral health assessment performed before a child reaches the age of one may help with managing caries. The oral health assessment should include checking the child's history, a clinical examination, checking the risk of caries in the child including the state of their occlusion and assessing how well equipped the child's parent or carer is to help the child prevent caries. To increase a child's cooperation in caries management further, good communication by the dentist and the rest of the staff of a dental practice should be used. This communication can be improved by calling the child by their name, maintaining eye contact, and including them in conversations about their treatment.

Vaccines are also under development.

== Treatment ==
Diagnosis			Treatment
No carious lesion			No treatment
Carious lesion	Inactive lesion		No treatment
Carious lesion	Active lesion	Non-cavitated lesion	Non-operative treatment
Carious lesion	Active lesion	Cavitated lesion	Operative treatment
Existing filling	No defect		No replacement
Existing filling	Defective filling	Ditching, overhang	No replacement
Existing filling	Defective filling	Fracture or food impaction	Repair or replacement of filling
Existing filling	Inactive lesion		No treatment
Existing filling	Active lesion	Non-cavitated lesion	Non-operative treatment
Existing filling	Active lesion	Cavitated lesion	Repair or replacement of filling

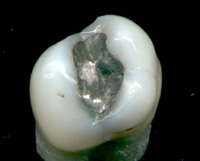
An amalgam used as a restorative material in a tooth

Most importantly, whether the carious lesion is cavitated or non-cavitated dictates the management. Clinical assessment of whether the lesion is active or arrested is also important. Noncavitated lesions can be stopped, and remineralization can occur under the right conditions. However, this may require extensive changes to the diet (reducing the frequency of refined sugar consumption), improved oral hygiene (toothbrushing twice per day with fluoride toothpaste and daily flossing), and regular application of topical fluoride. More recently, Immunoglobulin Y specific to Streptococcus mutans has been used to suppress growth of S. mutans. Such management of a carious lesion is termed "non-operative" since no drilling is carried out on the tooth. Non-operative treatment requires excellent understanding and motivation from the individual; otherwise, the decay will continue.

Once a lesion has cavitated, especially if dentin is involved, remineralization is much more difficult, and a dental restoration is usually indicated ("operative treatment"). Before a restoration can be placed, all decay must be removed; otherwise, it will continue to progress underneath the filling. Sometimes, a small amount of decay can remain if it is entombed and a seal isolates the bacteria from their substrate. This can be likened to placing a glass container over a candle, which burns itself out once the oxygen is used up. Techniques such as stepwise caries removal are designed to avoid exposure of the dental pulp and overall reduction of the amount of tooth substance that requires removal before the final filling is placed. Often, enamel, which overlies decayed dentin, must also be removed as it is unsupported and susceptible to fracture. The modern decision-making process regarding the activity of the lesion, and whether it is cavitated, is summarized in the table.

Destroyed tooth structure does not fully regenerate, although remineralization of very small carious lesions may occur if dental hygiene is kept at an optimal level. For the small lesions, topical fluoride is sometimes used to encourage remineralization. For larger lesions, the progression of dental caries can be stopped with treatment. The goal of treatment is to preserve tooth structures and prevent further destruction of the tooth. Aggressive treatment, by filling, of incipient carious lesions, places where there is superficial damage to the enamel, is controversial, as they may heal themselves, while once a filling is performed, it will eventually have to be redone, and the site serves as a vulnerable site for further decay.

In general, early treatment is quicker and less expensive than treatment of extensive decay. Local anesthetics, nitrous oxide ("laughing gas"), or other prescription medications may be required in some cases to relieve pain during or following treatment or to relieve anxiety during treatment. A dental handpiece ("drill") is used to remove large portions of decayed material from a tooth. A spoon, a dental instrument used to remove decay carefully, is sometimes employed when the decay in dentin reaches near the pulp. Some dentists remove dental caries using a laser rather than the traditional dental drill. A Cochrane review of this technique looked at Er:YAG (erbium-doped yttrium aluminium garnet), Er,Cr:YSGG (erbium, chromium: yttrium-scandium-gallium-garnet) and Nd:YAG (neodymium-doped yttrium aluminium garnet) lasers and found that although people treated with lasers (compared to a conventional dental "drill") experienced less pain and had a lesser need for dental anaesthesia, that overall there was little difference in caries removal. Another alternative to drilling or lasers for small caries is the use of air abrasion, in which small abrasive particles are blasted at decay using pressurized air (similar to sand blasting). Once the decay is removed, the missing tooth structure requires a dental restoration of some sort to return the tooth to function and aesthetic condition.

Restorative materials include dental amalgam, composite resin, glass ionomer cement, porcelain, and gold. Composite resin and porcelain can be made to match the color of a patient's natural teeth and are thus used more frequently when aesthetics are a concern. Composite restorations are not as strong as dental amalgam and gold; some dentists consider the latter as the only advisable restoration for posterior areas where chewing forces are great. When the decay is too extensive, there may not be enough tooth structure remaining to allow a restorative material to be placed within the tooth. Thus, a crown may be needed. This restoration resembles a cap and is fitted over the remaining natural crown of the tooth. Crowns are often made of gold, porcelain, or porcelain fused to metal.

For children, preformed crowns are available to place over the tooth. These are usually made of metal (usually stainless steel, but increasingly there are aesthetic materials). Traditionally, teeth are shaved down to make room for the crown, but more recently, stainless steel crowns have been used to seal decay into the tooth and stop it from progressing. This is known as the Hall Technique and works by depriving the bacteria in the decay of nutrients and making their environment less favorable for them. It is a minimally invasive method of managing decay in children and does not require local anesthetic injections in the mouth.

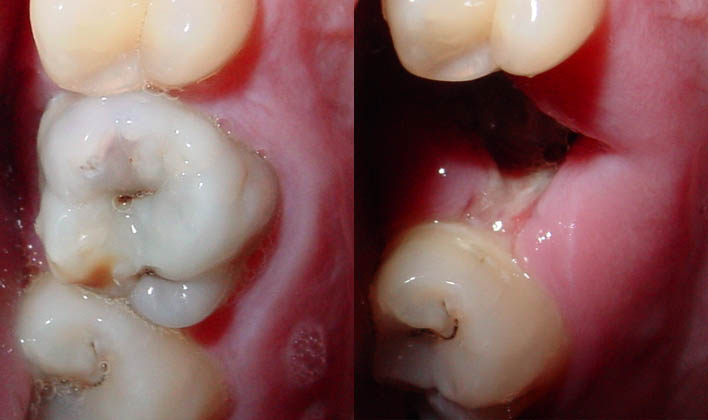
A tooth with extensive caries eventually requiring extraction

In certain cases, endodontic therapy may be necessary to restore a tooth. Endodontic therapy, also known as a "root canal", is recommended if the pulp in a tooth dies from infection by decay-causing bacteria or from trauma. In root canal therapy, the pulp of the tooth, including the nerve and vascular tissues, is removed along with decayed portions of the tooth. The canals are instrumented with endodontic files to clean and shape them, and they are then usually filled with a rubber-like material called gutta percha. The tooth is filled, and a crown can be placed. Upon completion of root canal therapy, the tooth is non-vital, as it is devoid of any living tissue.

An extraction can also serve as treatment for dental caries. The removal of the decayed tooth is performed if the tooth is too severely damaged from the decay process to be effectively restored. Extractions are sometimes considered if the tooth lacks an opposing tooth or will probably cause further problems in the future, as may be the case for wisdom teeth. Extractions may also be preferred by people unable or unwilling to undergo the expense or difficulties in restoring the tooth.

Recent studies from the University of Michigan demonstrated that silver diamine fluoride (SDF) is effective in stopping tooth decay when applied to the teeth of young children. The silver ions in SDF denature bacterial proteins and enzymes, effectively killing cariogenic bacteria such as Streptococcus mutans.

== Epidemiology ==
Disability-adjusted life year for dental caries per 100,000 inhabitants in 2004: No data <50 50–60 60–70 70–80 80–90 90–100 / 100–115 115–130 130–138 138–140 140–142 >142

Worldwide, approximately 3.6 billion people have dental caries in their permanent teeth. In baby teeth, it affects about 620 million people or 9% of the population. The disease is most common in Latin American countries, countries in the Middle East, and South Asia, and least prevalent in China. In the United States, dental caries is the most common chronic childhood disease, being at least five times more common than asthma. It is the primary pathological cause of tooth loss in children. Between 29% and 59% of adults over the age of 50 experience caries.

Treating dental cavities costs 5–10% of health-care budgets in industrialized countries, and can easily exceed budgets in lower-income countries.

The number of cases has decreased in some developed countries, and this decline is usually attributed to increasingly better oral hygiene practices and preventive measures such as fluoride treatment. Nonetheless, countries that have experienced an overall decrease in cases of tooth decay continue to have a disparity in the distribution of the disease. Among children in the United States and Europe, twenty percent of the population endures sixty to eighty percent of cases of dental caries. A similarly skewed distribution of the disease is found throughout the world, with some children having none or very few caries and others having a high number. Australia, Nepal, and Sweden (where the government pays for children to receive dental care) have a low incidence of cases of dental caries among children. Cases are more numerous in Costa Rica and Slovakia.

The classic DMF (decay/missing/filled) index is one of the most common methods for assessing caries prevalence as well as dental treatment needs in populations. This index is based on in-field clinical examination of individuals by using a probe, mirror, and cotton rolls. Because the DMF index is calculated without X-ray imaging, it underestimates true caries prevalence and treatment needs.

Bacteria typically associated with dental caries have been isolated from vaginal samples from females who have bacterial vaginosis.

== History ==
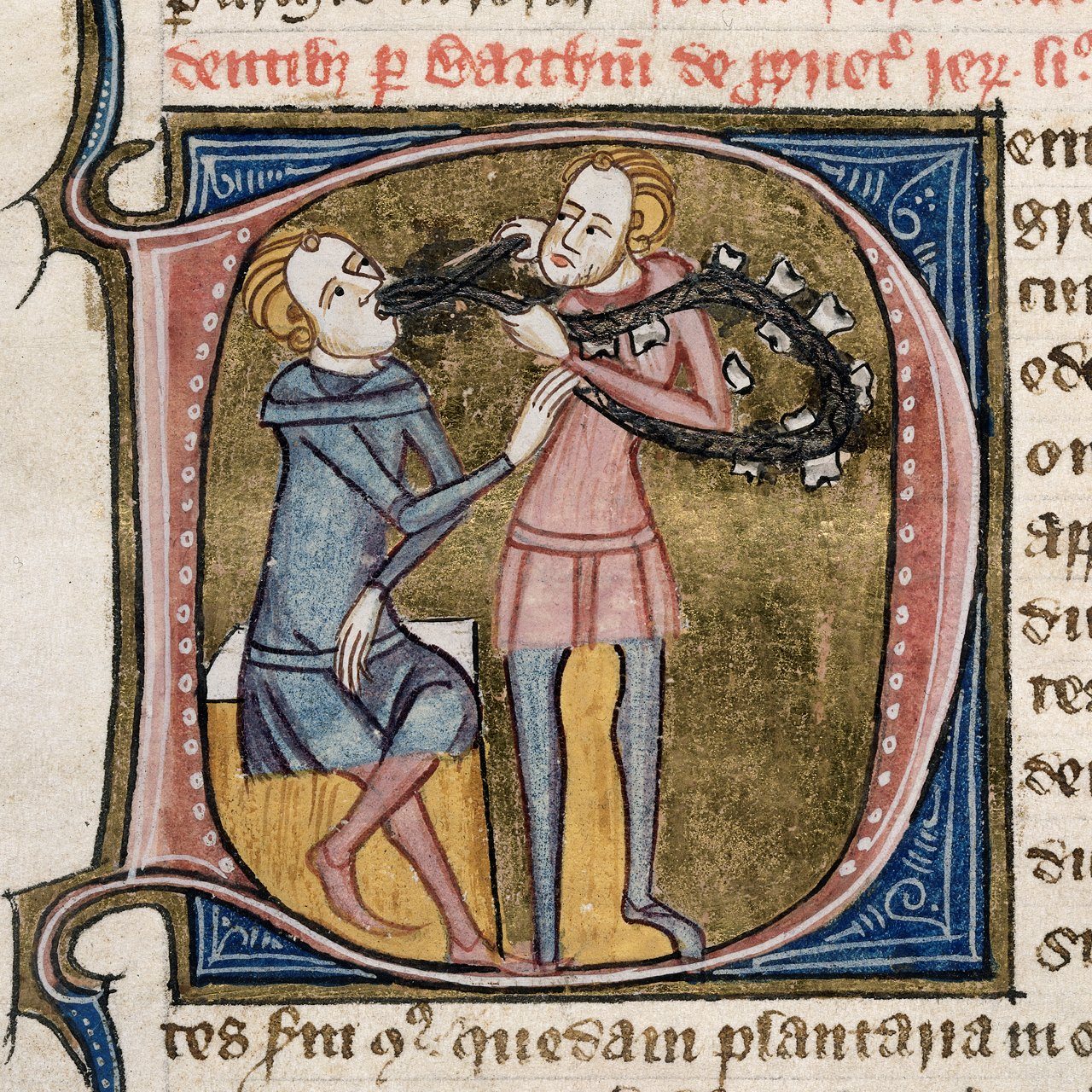
An image from Omne Bonum (14th century) depicting a dentist extracting a tooth with forceps

There is a long history of dental caries. Over a million years ago, hominins such as Paranthropus had cavities. The largest increases in the prevalence of caries have been associated with dietary changes.

Archaeological evidence shows that tooth decay is an ancient disease dating far into prehistory. Skulls dating from a million years ago through the Neolithic period show signs of caries, including those from the Paleolithic and Mesolithic ages. The increase of caries during the Neolithic period may be attributed to the increased consumption of plant foods containing carbohydrates. The beginning of rice cultivation in South Asia is also believed to have caused an increase in caries especially for women, although there is also some evidence from sites in Thailand, such as Khok Phanom Di, that shows a decrease in overall percentage of dental caries with the increase in dependence on rice agriculture.

A Sumerian text from 5000 BC describes a "tooth worm" as the cause of caries. Evidence of this belief has also been found in India, Egypt, Japan, and China. Unearthed ancient skulls show evidence of primitive dental work. In Pakistan, teeth dating from around 5500 BC to 7000 BC show nearly perfect holes from primitive dental drills. The Ebers Papyrus, an Egyptian text from 1550 BC, mentions diseases of teeth. During the Sargonid dynasty of Assyria during 668 to 626 BC, writings from the king's physician specify the need to extract a tooth due to spreading inflammation. In the Roman Empire, wider consumption of cooked foods led to a small increase in caries prevalence. The Greco-Roman civilization, in addition to the Egyptian civilization, had treatments for pain resulting from caries.

The rate of caries remained low through the Bronze Age and Iron Age, but sharply increased during the Middle Ages. Periodic increases in caries prevalence had been small in comparison to the 1000 AD increase, when sugar cane became more accessible to the Western world. Treatment consisted mainly of herbal remedies and charms, but sometimes also included bloodletting. The barber surgeons of the time provided services that included tooth extractions. Learning their training from apprenticeships, these health providers were quite successful in ending tooth pain and likely prevented systemic spread of infections in many cases. Among Roman Catholics, prayers to Saint Apollonia, the patroness of dentistry, were meant to heal pain derived from tooth infection.

There is also evidence of caries increase when Indigenous people in North America changed from a strictly hunter-gatherer diet to a diet with maize. Rates also increased after contact with colonizing Europeans, implying an even greater dependence on maize.

During the European Age of Enlightenment, the belief that a "tooth worm" caused caries was also no longer accepted in the European medical community. Pierre Fauchard, known as the father of modern dentistry, was one of the first to reject the idea that worms caused tooth decay and noted that sugar was detrimental to the teeth and gingiva. In 1850, another sharp increase in the prevalence of caries occurred and is believed to be a result of widespread diet changes. Before this time, cervical caries was the most frequent type of caries. The increased availability of sugar cane, refined flour, bread, and sweetened tea corresponded with a greater number of pit and fissure caries.

In the 1890s, W. D. Miller conducted a series of studies that led him to propose an explanation for dental caries that was influential for current theories. He found that bacteria inhabited the mouth and that they produced acids that dissolved tooth structures when in the presence of fermentable carbohydrates. This explanation is known as the chemoparasitic caries theory. Miller's contribution, along with the research on plaque by G. V. Black and J. L. Williams, served as the foundation for the current explanation of the etiology of caries. Several of the specific strains of lactobacilli were identified in 1921 by Fernando E. Rodríguez Vargas.

In 1924, in London, Killian Clarke described a spherical bacterium in chains isolated from carious lesions, which he called Streptococcus mutans. Although Clarke proposed that this organism was the cause of caries, the discovery was not followed up. Later, in 1954 in the US, Frank Orland, working with hamsters, showed that caries was transmissible and caused by acid-producing Streptococcus thus ending the debate whether dental caries resulted from bacteria. It was not until the late 1960s that it became generally accepted that the Streptococcus isolated from hamster caries was the same as S. mutans.

Tooth decay has been present throughout human history, from early hominids millions of years ago, to modern humans. The prevalence of caries increased dramatically in the 19th century, as the Industrial Revolution made certain items, such as refined sugar and flour, readily available. The diet of the "newly industrialized English working class" then became centered on bread, jam, and sweetened tea, greatly increasing both sugar consumption and caries.

=== Etymology and usage ===
Naturalized from Latin into English (a loanword), caries in its English form originated as a mass noun that means 'rottenness', that is, 'decay'. The word is an uncountable noun.

Cariesology or cariology is the study of dental caries.

== Society and culture ==
It is estimated that untreated dental caries results in worldwide productivity losses of about US$27 billion yearly.

== Other animals ==
Dental caries are uncommon among companion animals.

== See also ==
- Cariogram
- Silver diammine fluoride
