= Cariogram =

Dental illustration

Cariogram is a way to illustrate interactions between caries, or tooth cavity, related factors. It demonstrates the caries risk graphically and shows the risk for developing new caries in the future and also chances to avoid new caries in the near future. It helps to understand the multifactorial aspects of dental caries. It can be used as a guide in attempts to estimate caries risk. While useful, a cariogram cannot replace the personal and professional judgement of caries risk made by the examiner.
