= Dental explorer =

Instrument in dentistry

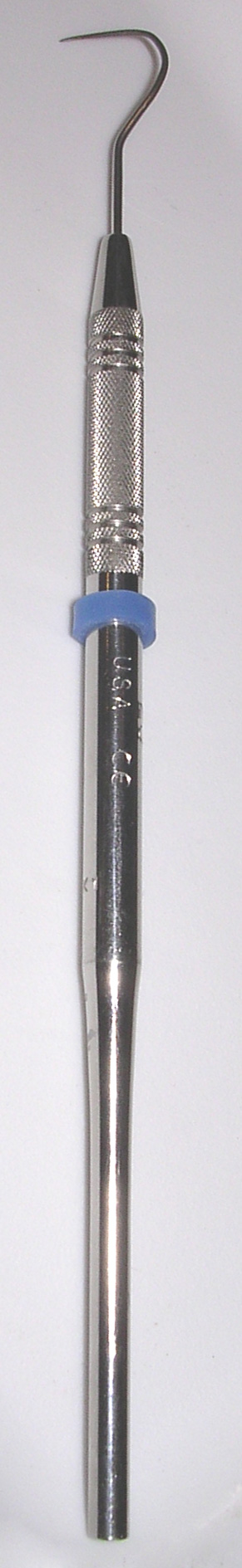
A No. 23 explorer, also known as a 'sickle probe'

Dental explorers, also known as sickle probes, are tools found in the dental arsenal that are frequently utilised. The explorer is designed with a sharp tip at the end to improve tactile perception.

In the past, it was usual for dentists to use the explorer to probe teeth for the presence of cavities. Some dental professionals have questioned this practice in the twenty-first century. The use of a sharp explorer to diagnose caries in pit and fissure sites is no longer recommended, and clinicians instead should rely on "sharp eyes and a blunt explorer or probe." Penetration by a sharp explorer causes cavitation in areas that are remineralizing or could be remineralized. Dental lesions initially develop a subsurface lesion. Early lesions may be reversed with meticulous patient self-care and application of fluoride, as long as the thin surface layer remains intact. The use of a dental explorer with firm pressure to probe suspicious areas may result in the rupture of the surface layer covering early lesions. Instead, they argue that fluoride and oral hygiene should be used to remineralize the enamel and prevent it from decaying further. This continues because sometimes decay can be difficult to diagnose without tactile verification. Additionally, radiographs and other products designed to identify decay (such as measuring fluorescence from a laser) help the dental professional make a final diagnosis of tooth decay.

There are various types of explorers, though the most common one is the No. 23 explorer, which is also known as a "shepherd's hook". Other types include the 3CH (also known as "cowhorn" or "pigtail") and No. 17 explorers, which are useful for the interproximal areas between teeth.

== The 11/12 Explorer ==
An 11/12 type explorer is a double-ended dental assessment instrument with mirror image working-ends. The 11/12 dental explorer should be considered a dental hygienists most important instrument for the detection of subgingival and supragingival calculus. This instrument is used with the modified pen grasp and a feather light grip allowing for detection of both grainy and bindable deposits. Learning its adaptability is critical for the successful tactile sensations needed for the confirmation of calculus removal.

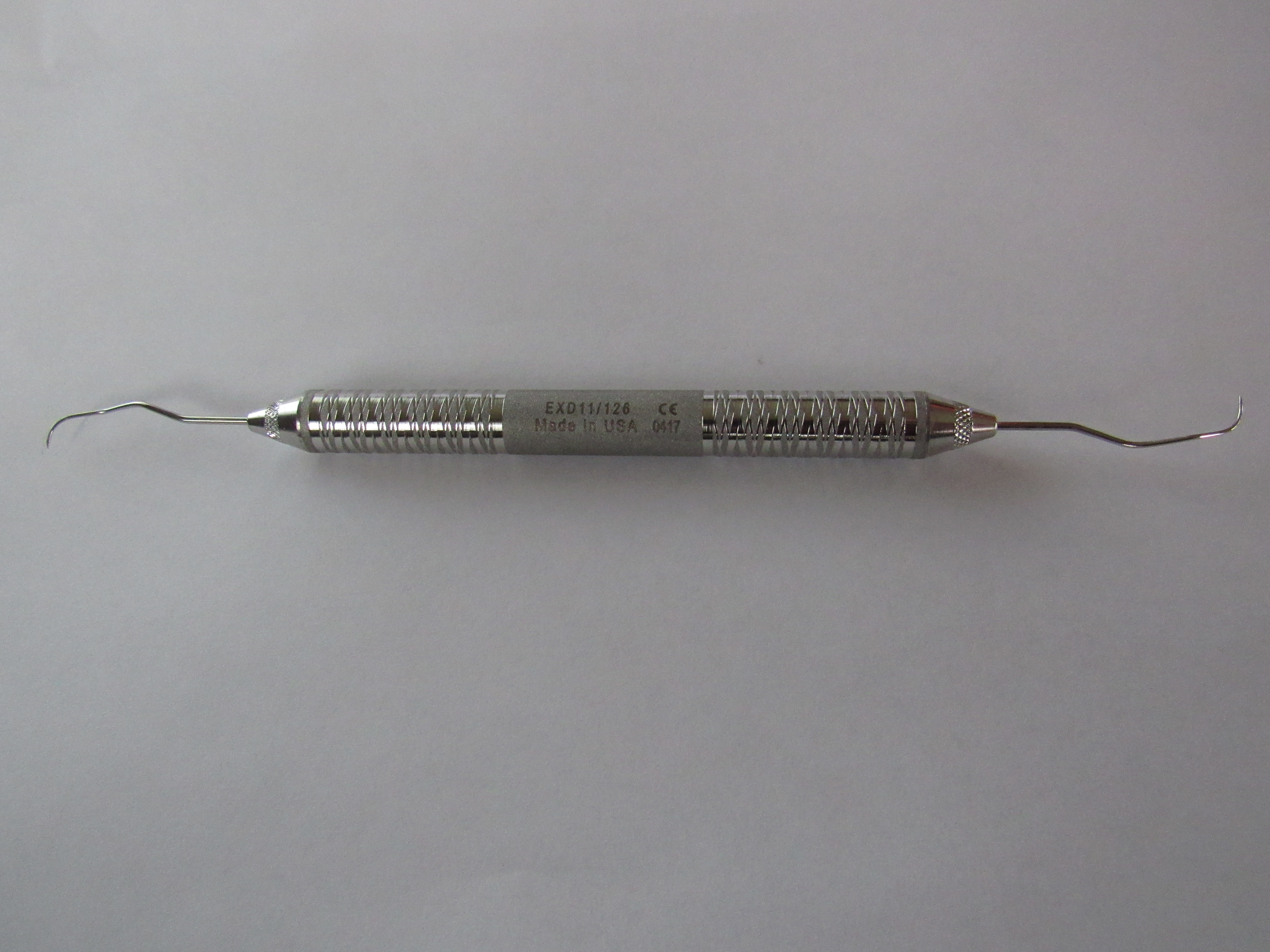
11/12 Dental Explorer

=== Design characteristics ===
- The tip is at a 90- degree angle to the lower shank
- The long intricate shank design makes it equally useful when working on anterior and posterior teeth with normal sulci or a deep periodontal pocket.
- The design of the tip allows the back of the tip to be applied to the pocket base without lacerating the junctional epithelium, allowing adaptation to all surfaces throughout the mouth.

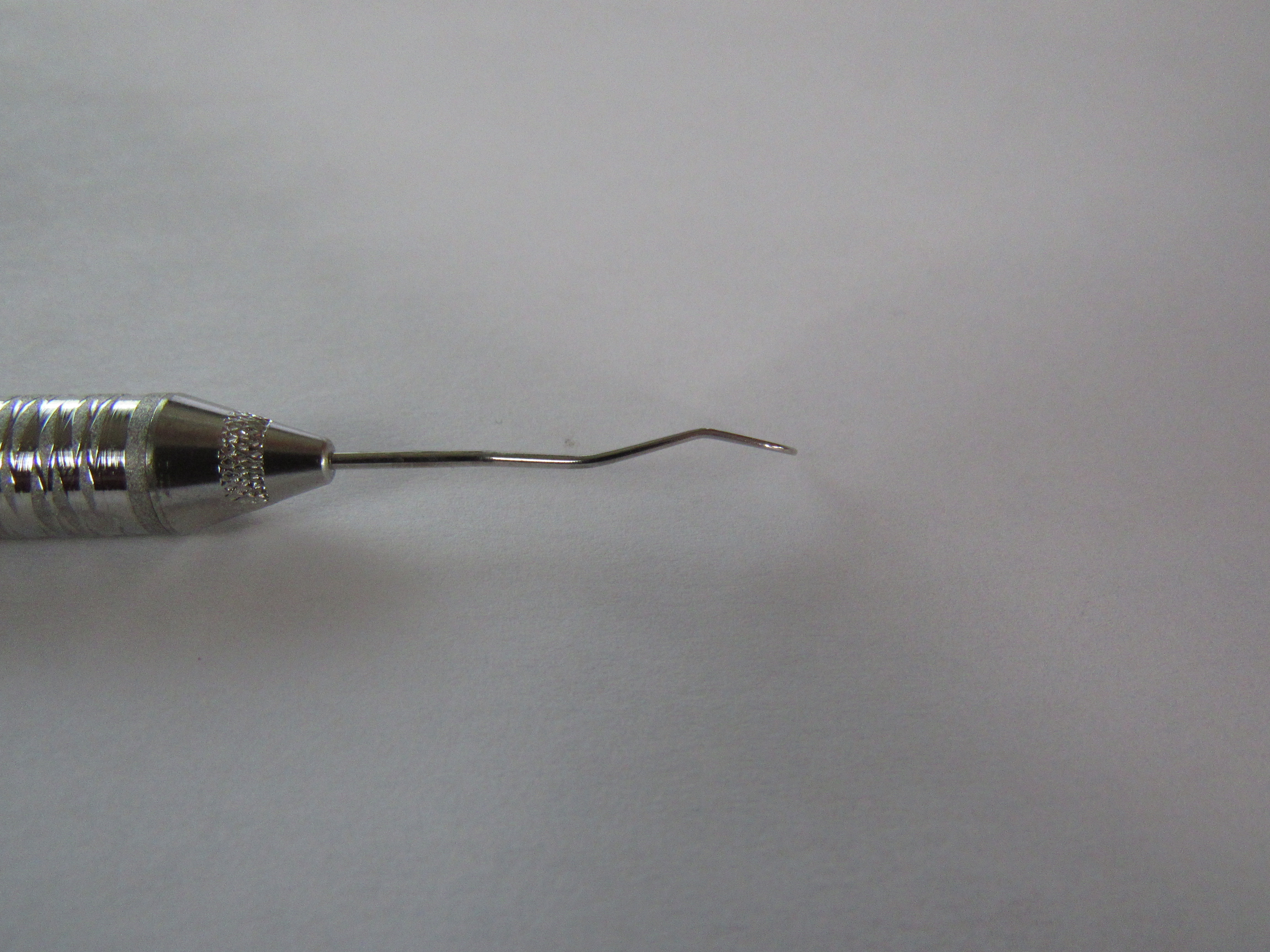
90 degree angle

Use: Assessment of root surfaces on anterior and posterior teeth.

=== The assessment stroke ===
Also known as the exploratory stroke, is used to detect calculus deposits and root surface irregularities. These kinds of strokes do require a high degree of precision for the accurate detection of unseen anomalies. Tactile sensitivity is key with this stroke, it is used to detect tooth irregularities by feeling vibration transferred from the explorer tip to the handle.

The table below outlines the assessment stroke with an explorer:

Assessment Stroke with an Explorer
Grasp: Relaxed grasp; middle finger rests lightly on shank
Adaptation: 1–2 mm of the side of the tip is adapted; often referred to as "the tip 1/3"
Lateral Pressure: Feather light pressure with working-end against tooth
Activation: Wrist activation is usually recommended, however digital activation is acceptable with an explorer because physical strength is NOT required for assessment strokes.
Stroke Characteristics: Fluid, sweeping strokes
Stroke Number: Many close, overlapping multidirectional strokes are used to cover all of the root surface

Common errors with the use of the 11/12 explorer is the use of a tight, tense "death grip" on the handle blanching the fingers at the joints. This disables the tactile sense needed to feel for the irregularities on the root surfaces. It is important to avoid pressing the middle finger against the instrument shank, thus reducing the tactile information to the finger.

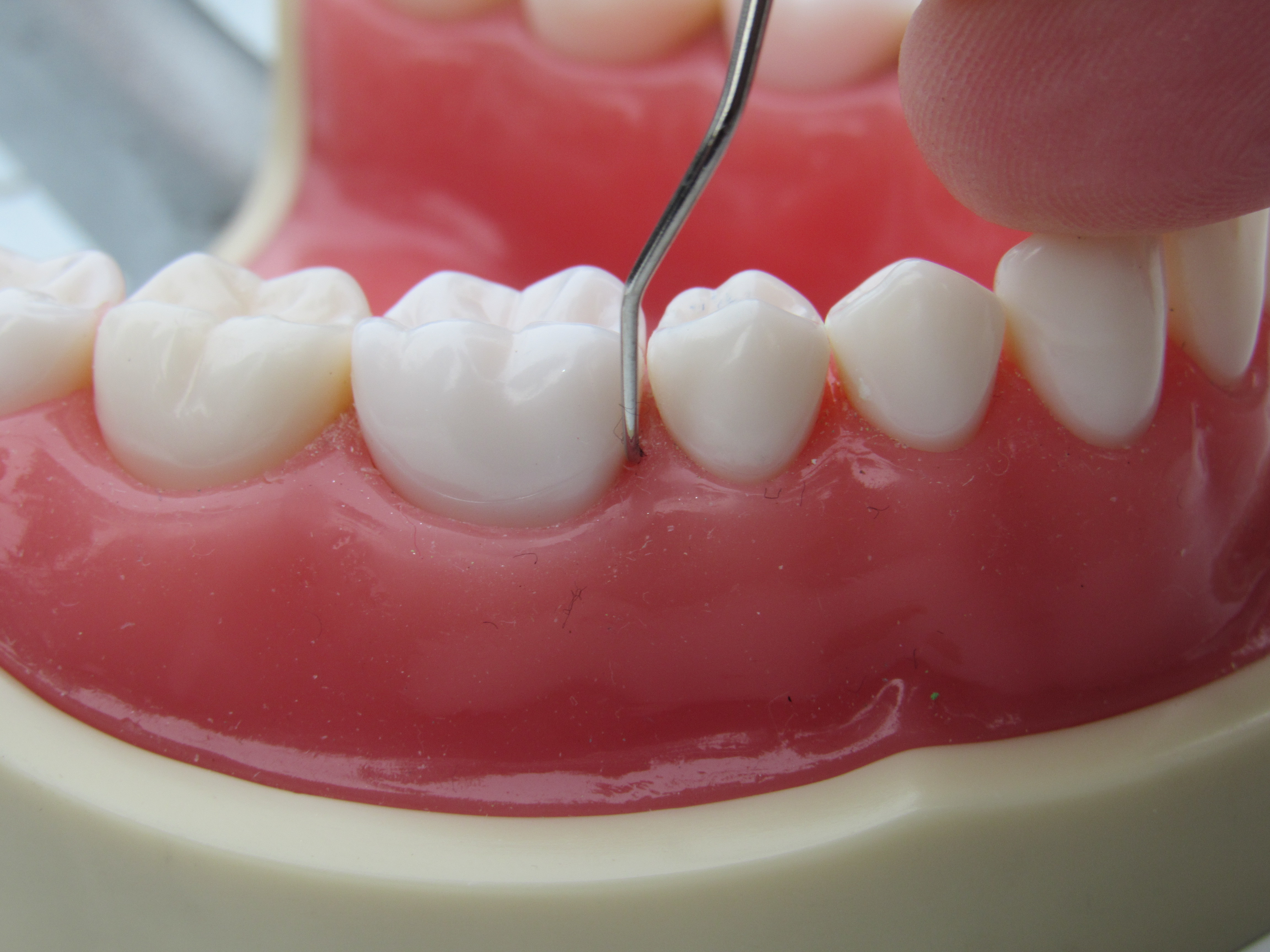
Adaptation of the 11/12 Dental Explorer at the MB line angle

=== Adaptability ===
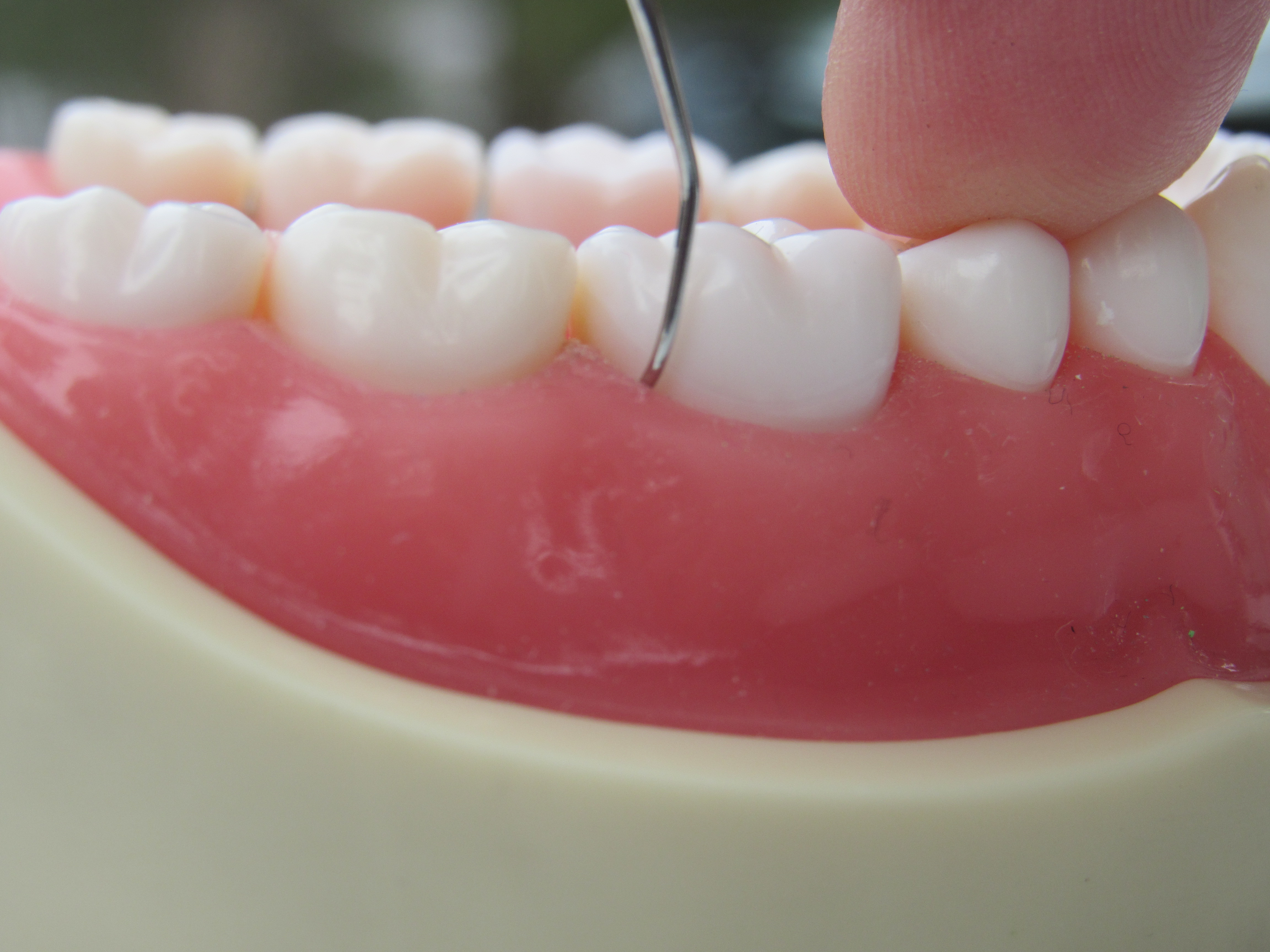
Adaptation of the 11/12 Dental Explorer at the DB line angle

It is crucial to keep the terminal shank parallel to the long axis of the tooth and to use the tip third of the instrument at all times. If adapted correctly the instrument "elbow" will be angled towards the distal.

For posterior placement, the instrument is inserted subgingival at the distal line angle of the tooth and using small multi-directional angles moving the tip third in contact with the tooth into the direction of the interproximal space. The instrument can be removed, reinserted at the distal line angle, now with the tip third in the direction toward the mesial of the tooth. Using the same multi-directional movements with the feather light grasp, follow the contour of the buccal or lingual aspects of the tooth around to the mesial line angle, here roll the instrument with the index finger the thumb into the interproximal space.

=== Subgingival exploring ===
Without the use of our 11/12 explorer we are only assuming we have removed all subgingival and supragingival calculus. It is imperative to use many different overlapping stokes for subgingival assessment of residual deposits.

==== Steps for subgingival assessment ====
1. Insertion: Adapt the explorers tip 1/3 against the tooth surface above the gingival margin and carefully slide the tip beneath the gingival margin.
2. Reach the base of the sulcus: Always keep the tip in contact with the root surface to avoid laceration of the gingiva. You will know you are at the base of the sulcus when the tissue feels soft and elastic.
3. Begin assessment stroke in coronal direction: Direct the tip 1/3 of the instrument forward slightly and use a oblique or vertical stroke along the root surface.
4. Control the length of the stroke: Do not remove the explorer from the sulcus.
5. Mentally section the tooth into apical, middle, and cervical sections: Allow 2-3mm length assessment strokes.
  1. For a healthy sulcus of less than 3mm; strokes will extend from the base of the sulcus to just beneath the gingival margin. Be careful not to come out of the sulcus.
  2. For a deeper sulcus depth begin exploration of the root at the base of the pocket. Then advance the tip 1/3 to the middle section on the root, followed by the coronal portion.
6. Proximal surfaces: For assessing the mesial and distal proximal surfaces lead with the tip of the explorer. These strokes should reach under the contact area, so that the proximal surface is explored half from the facial/buccal aspect and the other half from the lingual aspect.

=== Anterior teeth technique ===
Anterior teeth are assessed using our clock positioning as fundamentals to proper adaptation of the 11/12 explorer.

Clock positions for the right-handed clinicians:

- Surfaces toward: the clinician must sit at the 8-9 o'clock position
- Surfaces away: the clinician must sit at the 11-1 o'clock position

Clock positions for the left-handed clinicians:

- Surfaces toward: the clinician must sit at the 3-4 o'clock position
- Surfaces away: the clinician must sit at the 11-1 o'clock position
