= Vijay P. Parashar =

Vijay P Parashar
- Education: University of Connecticut, University of Detroit Mercy, Manipal Academy of Higher Education
- Employer(s): College of Dental Medicine, Midwestern University, Glendale, AZ
- Known for: Dentistry, dental education, oral and maxillofacial radiology, cone beam imaging
- Awards: Howard R Raper Award and William H Rollins Award

Vijay P. Parashar is an oral and maxillofacial radiologist working as faculty at Midwestern University in Glendale, Arizona. Prior to joining Midwestern University as Associate Professor, Parashar was the Assistant Professor of Biomedical and Diagnostic Sciences at University of Detroit Mercy in Detroit, Michigan.

Parashar won the 2006 Howard R. Raper and 2012 William H Rollins Oral and Maxillofacial Radiology Awards given by American Academy of Oral and Maxillofacial Radiology. Parashar received Doctor of Dental Surgery (DDS) from the University of Detroit Mercy School of Dentistry, Master of Dental Science from the University of Connecticut School of Dental Medicine, Certification in Oral and Maxillofacial Radiology from the University of Connecticut School of Dental Medicine and Bachelor of Dental Surgery from Manipal College of Dental Sciences, Manipal. Parashar is on the scientific editorial board of peer-reviewed journals such as Journal of Oral Health and Community, India Dentistry, International Journal of Oral Implantology and Clinical Research, India, and American Journal of Esthetic Dentistry, USA.

Parashar's positions with ADEA include:

Chair 2010 – 2011, Oral & Maxillofacial Radiology Section, Chair-elect 2009 – 2010, Oral & Maxillofacial Radiology Section and Secretary 2008 – 2009, Oral & Maxillofacial Radiology Section.

Parashar is currently serving on the ADA Commission on Dental Accreditation (CODA) Oral Radiology Review Committee; ADEA Council of Faculties; National Board Dental Test Construction Committee and is a CODA Site Visitor.

== Awards and fellowships ==
Parashar has been awarded academic awards and fellowship in the field of oral and maxillofacial radiology and dentistry, respectively.

He was given the William H Rollins Award in 2012.

In 2012, he was inducted into the Pierre Fauchard Academy.

Parashar was awarded the Howard R. Raper Oral and Maxillofacial Radiology Award in 2006.

== Publications ==
- dSir2 mediates the increased spontaneous physical activity in flies on calorie restriction, Vijay Parashar, and Blanka Rogina, Impact Aging, Pg 529-542, Vol. 1, No. 6.
- The Effects of Age on Radiation Resistance and Oxidative Stress in Adult Drosophila melanogaster, Vijay Parashar, Stewart Frankel, Alan G. Lurie, and Blanka Rogina, Radiation Research, Volume 169, Issue 6, January 2008.
- dSir2 and fly mobility, Vijay Parashar, Blanka Rogina, Cell Cycle, Volume 9, Issue 3, February 2010.
- Review of neuropathic pain conditions affecting teeth and its relevance in endodontics, Koratkar H, Parashar V, Matapurkar S., General Dentistry, 2010 Sep-Oct; 58(5):436-41; quiz 442-3.
- Cone Beam Computed Tomography in Dental Education: A Survey of U.S., U.K., and Australian Dental Schools, Parashar et al., Journal of Dental Education, November 1, 2012 vol. 76, no. 11, 1443-1447.
- Parental Presence during their child's treatment, Vijay Parashar, J Oral Health Comm Dent 2010;4 Contact Author (3):52-54.
- Mucosal fixed drug eruption in a patient treated with ornidazole, Authors: Charu Mohan Marya, Gaurav Sharma, Vijay P Parashar, and Vandana Dahiya, J Dermatol Case Rep. Mar 27, 2012; 6(1): 21–24.
- The effect of exposure reduction on the diagnosis of caries: An ex vivo comparison of film and a CMOS digital imaging system, Authors: James R Geist, Ashok Balasundaram, Shin-Mey Rose Y Geist, Vijay Parashar, J Int Clin Dent Res Organ [serial online] Year: 2010, Volume: 2, Issue: 3, Pg 142-152.
- Mandibular midline supernumerary tooth associated with agenesis of permanent central incisors: A diagnostic conundrum, Authors: Charu Mohan Marya, Gaurav Sharma, Vijay P. Parashar, Vandana Dahiya, Anil Gupta, Stomatologija, Baltic Dental and Maxillofacial Journal, 14:65-8, 2011.

== See also ==
- Allan G. Farman – Oral and Maxillofacial Radiologist and Professor
- Computed radiography
- Dental radiography
- Digital radiography
- List of University of Connecticut people
- Oral and maxillofacial radiology
