= Focal plane tomography =

Imaging technique using moving X-ray machines

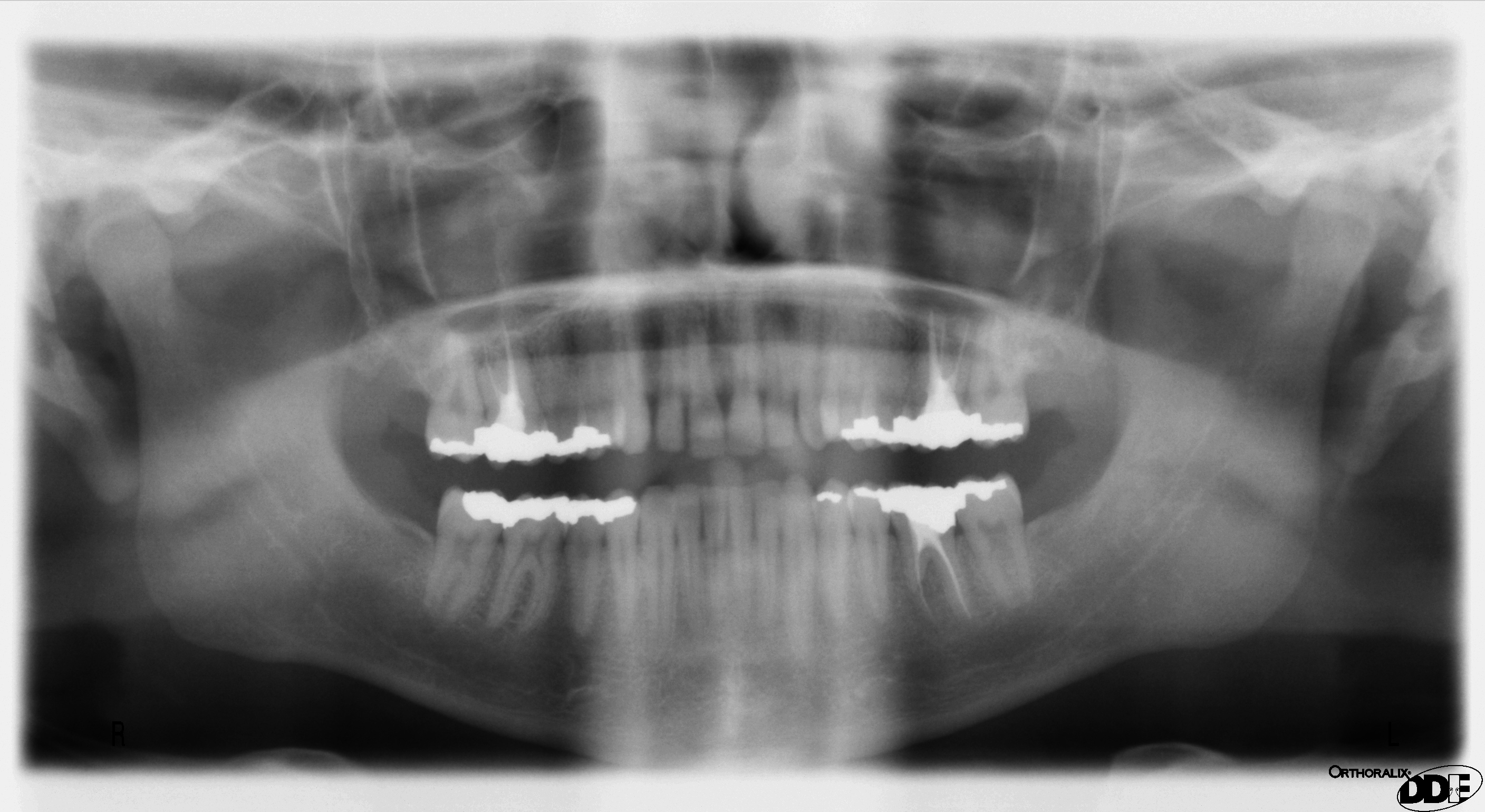
- An orthopantomograph, which uses focal plane tomography.
- Purpose: tomography imaging a single plane/slice

In radiography, focal plane tomography is tomography (imaging a single plane, or slice, of an object) by simultaneously moving the X-ray generator and X-ray detector so as to keep a consistent exposure of only the plane of interest during image acquisition. This was the main method of obtaining tomographs in medical imaging until the late-1970s. It has since been largely replaced by more advanced imaging techniques such as CT and MRI. It remains in use today in a few specialized applications, such as for acquiring orthopantomographs of the jaw in dental radiography.

Focal plane tomography’s development began in the 1930s as a means of reducing the problem of superimposition of structures which is inherent to projectional radiography. It was invented in parallel by, among others, by the French physician Bocage, the Italian radiologist Alessandro Vallebona and the Dutch radiologist Bernard George Ziedses des Plantes.

== Technique ==
Focal plane tomography generally uses mechanical movement of an X-ray source and film in unison to generate a tomogram using the principles of projective geometry. Synchronizing the movement of the radiation source and detector which are situated in the opposite direction from each other causes structures which are not in the focal plane being studied to blur out.

=== Limitations ===
The blurring provided by focal plane tomography is only marginally effective, since it only occurs in the X plane. Moreover, since focal plane tomography uses plain X-rays, it is not particularly effective at resolving soft tissues.

The increased availability and power of computers in the 1960s and 70s gave rise to new imaging techniques such as CT and MRI which use computational (in addition to or in lieu of mechanical) methods to acquire and process tomographic image data, and which do not suffer from the limitations of focal plane tomography.

== Variants ==
Initially focal plane tomography used simple linear movements. The technique advanced through the mid-twentieth century however, steadily producing sharper images, and with a greater ability to vary the thickness of the cross-section being examined. This was achieved through the introduction of more complex, pluridirectional devices that can move in more than one plane and perform more effective blurring.

=== Linear tomography ===
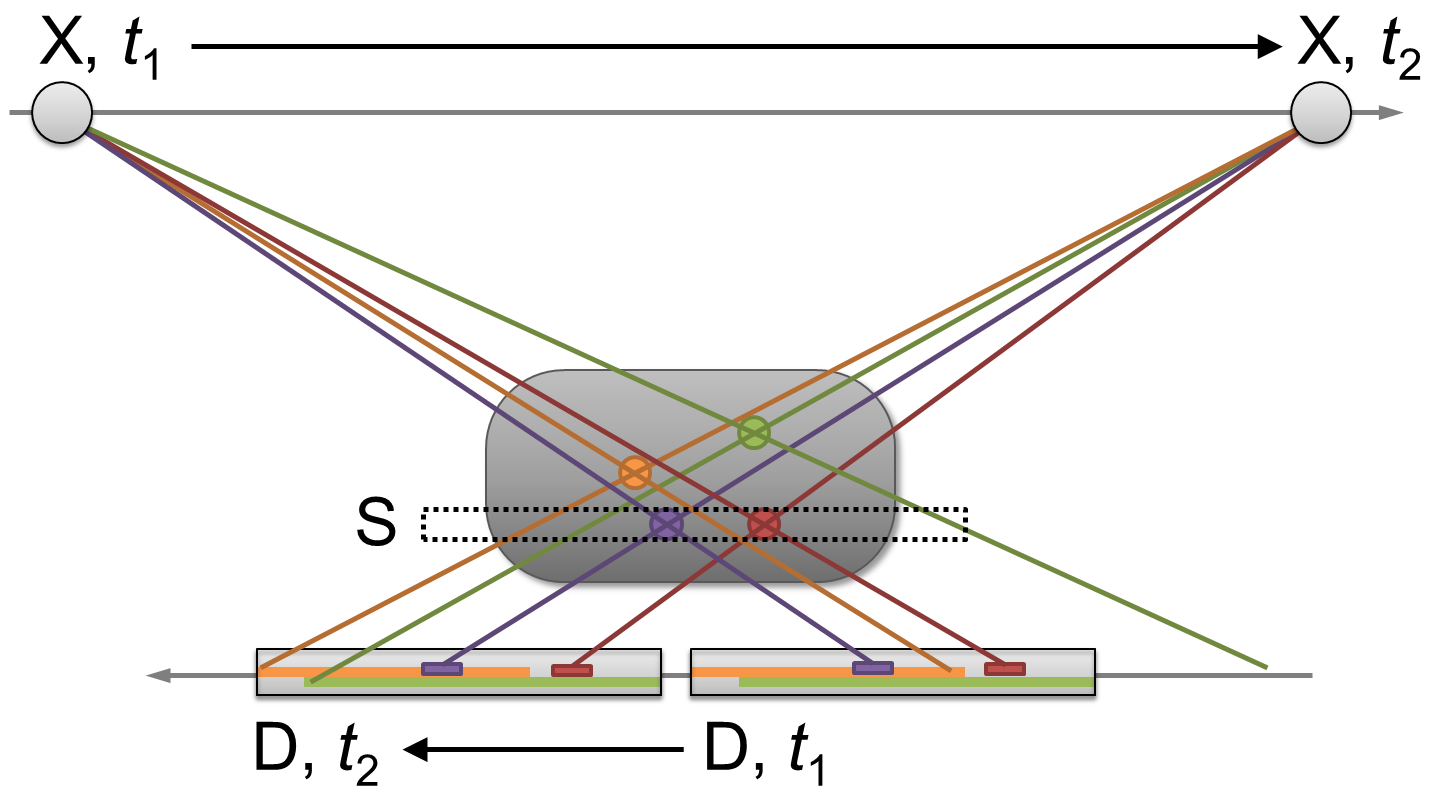
An illustration of the source/detector motion involved in linear tomography, with in-focus objects in the slice plane (red and purple) and blurred objects above and below (orange and green)

This is the most basic form of conventional tomography. The X-ray tube moved from point "A" to point "B" above the patient, while the detector (such as cassette holder or "bucky") moves simultaneously under the patient from point "B" to point "A". The fulcrum, or pivot point, is set to the area of interest. In this manner, the points above and below the focal plane are blurred out, just as the background is blurred when panning a camera during exposure. Rarely used, and has largely been replaced by computed tomography (CT).

=== Poly tomography ===
External videos
- Polytome Myelogram Study, 1969 (YouTube) – LA Foundation of Otology film depicting a Polytome being used in a myelography exam to diagnose an acoustic neuroma tumor. Nowadays, this type of tumor would be evaluated using a contrast-enhanced MRI scan.

This was achieved using a more advanced X-ray apparatus that allows for more sophisticated and continuous movements of the X-ray tube and film. With this technique, a number of complex synchronous geometrical movements could be programmed, such as hypocycloidic, circular, figure 8, and elliptical. Philips Medical Systems for example produced one such device called the 'Polytome'. This pluridirectional unit was still in use into the 1990s, as its resulting images for small or difficult physiology, such as the inner ear, were still difficult to image with CTs at that time. As the resolution of CT scanners got better, this procedure was taken over by CT.

=== Zonography ===
This is a variant of linear tomography, where a limited arc of movement is used, resulting in less blurring than linear tomography. It is still used in some centres for visualising the kidney during an intravenous urogram (IVU), though it too is being supplanted by CT.

=== Panoramic radiograph ===
Panoramic radiography is the only common tomographic examination still in use. This makes use of a complex movement to allow the radiographic examination of the mandible, as if it were a flat bone. It is commonly performed in dental practices and is often referred to as a "Panorex", though this is a trademark of a specific company and not a generic term. It can also be referred to as OPG, from Orthopantomogram.

== See also ==
- Tomography
