= Nortjé =

Nortjé or Nortje is a surname. Notable people with the surname include:

- Anrich Nortje (born 1993), South African cricketer
- Arthur Nortje (1942–1970), South African poet
- Christoffel Nortje, South African dentist and emeritus professor
- Jan Nortje (born 1975), South African kickboxer
- Obert Nortjé (born 1997), Namibian rugby union player
- Ossie Nortjé (born 1990), South African rugby union player
- Piet Nortje, South African author of 32 Battalion: The Inside Story of South Africa's Elite Fighting Unit
- Ruan Nortjé (born 1998), South African rugby union player
- Ruth Nortje (born 1967), South African-born, American canoer
