= Conventional tomography =

Conventional tomography or plain tomography may refer to:

- Focal plane tomography, which historically was the main tomography method in radiography; nowadays mostly obsolete
- Computed tomography (CT) without the use of additional protocols such as CT colonography or CT pulmonary angiography
