= Allan G. Farman =

Allan George Farman (born 1949 in Birmingham, United Kingdom) is a Professor of Radiology and Imaging Science, Department of Surgical and Hospital Dentistry, The University of Louisville School of Dentistry, and also serves both as Adjunct Professor of Anatomical Sciences and Neurobiology and as Clinical Professor of Diagnostic Radiology of the School of Medicine in the same institution.

== Biography ==
Farman attended George Dixon Grammar School after which time he entered Birmingham University. In 2006 he was awarded the University of Louisville President's Medal for Distinguished Service. He is Honored Guest Professor to Peking University, Beijing, China. Farman graduated from dental school at the Birmingham University, United Kingdom in 1971. He holds doctorates in oral and maxillofacial pathology (PhD) and in oral and maxillofacial radiology (DSc), both from the University of Stellenbosch, South Africa. He has graduate degrees in education (EdS, higher education administration) and in business administration (MBA with distinction) from the University of Louisville, Kentucky. He is a diplomate of the American Board of Oral and Maxillofacial Radiology (since 1982) and was in 1996 awarded diplomate status of the Japanese Board of Oral and Maxillofacial Radiology. He has specialist practicing licenses from the Kentucky Board of Dentistry in oral and maxillofacial radiology, from the General Dental Council, UK, in dental and maxillofacial radiology, and from the Health Professions Council of South Africa in oral and maxillofacial pathology.

Farman has been a member of the American Academy of Oral and Maxilofacial Radiology since 1980 and served as newsletter editor (1984–1989), and as Councilor for Communications and Councilor for Educational Affairs. In 1988, he was elected scientific editor for a term that concluded in 1995 with the addition of "Oral Radiology" to the title of this journal and the publication of a special issue to commemorate the 100th birthday of the discovery of the x-ray. He was reappointed AAOMR scientific editor in 2005–09. Farman became AAOMR president elect in 2007 and served as President 2009–11.

Farman is founder and chair of the International Congress on Computed Maxillofacial Imaging (CMI) that has its 17th Annual Congress in conjunction with the Computer Assisted Radiology and Surgery (CARS) consortium of organizations in Berlin, Germany, June 2011. He is a member of the CARS Organizing Committee. He was 11th president of the International Association of DentoMaxilloFacial Radiology (IADMFR) (1994–1997) and has served as IADMFR Educational Trust Fund Chair since completing his term as president. He was the First Honorary President for the Latin American Congress on DentoMaxilloFacial Radiology, held in Brazil in 1996. From 2000 through 2010, he was appointed by each successive American Dental Association (ADA) president as ADA Voting Representative to the international Digital Imaging and Communications Committee (DICOM), and was founding chair of DICOM WG 22 (Dentistry) in 2003. He is a member of the DICOM International Congress Organizing Committee. He has served as a consultant to the ADA Council on Dental Practice and to the US Technical Advisory Group for the International Organization for Standardization (ISO) TC 106. He served as AAOMR representative to the ADA Council on Dental Benefits Codes Advisory Committee from 2012.

== Publications ==
- Lemke HU, Vannier MW, Inamura K, Farman AG, Doi K (editors). Computer Assisted Radiology and Surgery (Proceedings of the 23rd International Symposium: Berlin, Germany) 2009; Heidelberg: Springer Verlag. [Soft cover] Int J Comput Assist Radiol Surg (Volume 4, Supplement 1).
- Farman AG, Scarfe WC, Haskell BS (editors). Cone Beam Computed Tomography. Semin Orthod 2009;15:1-84.
- Lemke HU, Vannier MW, Inamura K, Farman AG, Doi K (editors). Computer Assisted Radiology and Surgery (Proceedings of the 22nd International Symposium: Barcelona, Spain) 2008; Heidelberg: Springer Verlag. [Soft cover] Int J Comput Assist Radiol Surg (Volume 3, Supplement 1).
- Lemke HU, Vannier MW, Inamura K, Farman AG, Doi K (editors). Computer Assisted Radiology and Surgery (Proceedings of the 21st International Symposium: Berlin, Germany) 2007; Heidelberg: Springer Verlag. [Soft cover; 559 pages.] Int J Comput Assist Radiol Surg (Volume 2, Supplement 1).
- Farman AG. Panoramic Radiology: Seminars on Maxillofacial Imaging and Interpretation. May 2007. Heidelberg: Springer Verlag. [Hardcover; 231 pages; 178 illustrations, 130 in color] ISBN 978-3-540-46229-3. Library of Congress Number: 2007921305.
- Lemke HU, Vannier MW, Inamura K, Farman AG, Doi K (editors). Computer Assisted Radiology and Surgery (Proceedings of the 20th International Symposium: Osaka, Japan) 2006; Heidelberg: Springer Verlag. [Soft cover; 542 pages.] Int J Comput Assist Radiol Surg (Volume 1, Supplement 1).
- Lemke HU, Inamura K, Doi K, Vannier MW, Farman AG (editors). Computer Assisted Radiology and Surgery (Proceedings of the 19th International Symposium: Chicago, Illinois) 2005; Amsterdam: Elsevier. ISBN 0-444-51872-X
- ASDA SCDI WG 12.1 (Farman AG, Goyette J, Co-Chairs), Implementation Requirement for DICOM in Dentistry. American Dental Association Technical Report No.1023. Chicago: ADA, 2005.
- Lemke HU, Vannier MW, Inamura K, Farman AG, Doi K, Reiber JHC (editors). Computer Assisted Radiology and Surgery (Proceedings of the 18th International Symposium: Chicago, Illinois) 2004; Amsterdam: Elsevier. ISBN 0-444-51731-6.
- Kapila S, Farman AG. Conference on Orthodontic Advances in Science and Technology (COAST) Foundation. Proceedings of the Inaugural Conference: Craniofacial Imaging in the 21st Century. Oxford, UK: Blackwell/Munksgaard. [Soft cover; 182 pages.] Orthod Craniofac Res 2003;6 (Supplement 1.) ISSN 1468-179X.
- Lemke HU, Vannier MW, Inamura K, Farman AG, Doi K, Reiber JHC (editors). Computer Assisted Radiology and Surgery (Proceedings of the 17th International Symposium: London, England) 2003; Amsterdam: Elsevier. ISBN 0-444-51387-6.
- Lemke HU, Vannier MW, Inamura K, Farman AG, Doi K, Reiber JHC (editors). Computer Assisted Radiology and Surgery (Proceedings of the 16th International Symposium: Paris, France) 2002; Berlin: Springer-Verlag. ISBN 3-540-43655-3.
- Lemke HU, Vannier MW, Inamura K, Farman AG, Doi K (editors). Computer Assisted Radiology and Surgery (Proceedings of the 15th International Symposium: Berlin, Germany) 2001; Amsterdam: Elsevier/Excerpta Medica. ISBN 0-444-50866-X
- Lemke HU, Vannier MW, Inamura K, Farman AG, Doi K (editors). Computer Assisted Radiology and Surgery (Proceedings of the 14th International Symposium: San Francisco) 2000; Amsterdam: Elsevier/Excerpta Medica. ISBN 0-444-50536-9.
- Lemke HU, Vannier MW, Inamura K, Farman AG (editors). Computer Assisted Radiology and Surgery (Proceedings of the 13th International Symposium: Paris, France) 1999; Amsterdam: Elsevier/Excerpta Medica. ISBN 0-444-50290-4.
- Lemke HU, Vannier MW, Inamura K, Farman AG (editors). Computer Assisted Radiology and Surgery (Proceedings of the 12th International Symposium: Tokyo, Japan) 1998; Amsterdam: Elsevier/Excerpta Medica. ISBN 0-444-82973-3.
- Farman AG, Ruprecht A, Gibbs SJ, Scarfe WC (editors). Advances in Maxillofacial Imaging (Proceedings of the 11th International Congress of Dentomaxillofacial Radiology: Louisville, Kentucky) 1997; Amsterdam: Elsevier/Excerpta Medica. ISBN 0-444-82542-8.
- Lemke HU, Inamura K, Vannier MW, Farman AG (editors). Computer Assisted Radiology (Proceedings of the 10th International Symposium: Paris, France) 1996; Amsterdam: Elsevier/Excerpta Medica. ISBN 0-444-82497-9.

== See also ==
- Dental radiography
- Vijay P. Parashar – Oral and Maxillofacial Radiologist and Associate Professor
- Oral and maxillofacial radiology
