= University of the Western Cape Faculty of Dentistry =

University of the Western Cape
- Faculty of Dentistry
- Motto: Respice Prospice
- Established: 1973
- Affiliations: WHO, IADR, AfDEA, AAU, ACU, CHEC, HESA, IAU
- Chancellor: Archbishop Thabo Makgoba
- Dean: Prof Y Osman
- Location: Cape Town, Western Cape, South Africa
- Campus: Main, Tygerberg, Mitchell's Plain
- Website: http://www.uwc.ac.za/dentistry

The Faculty of Dentistry at the University of the Western Cape (UWC) is the largest dental school in Africa. Located in Belville, near Cape Town the UWC Faculty of Dentistry offers the BChD (DDS) Degree, degree in dental hygiene, and post-graduate MChD, MSc(Dent) degrees.

Dean, Professor Osman

Tygerberg Medical Campus, as viewed from above

== History ==
The Faculty of Dentistry as it exists today inherits a rich history from both the University of the Western Cape and the University of Stellenbosch, drawing from the extensive academic backgrounds of both. In 1962 the University of Stellenbosch received approval to establish a Faculty of Dentistry and the site at Tygerberg Hospital was approved by the state. In 1971, foundations for the building were laid and provision was made for a fourth storey: the future home of UWC Faculty of Dentistry, a unique situation housing two faculties of dentistry under one roof. The first Dean of Dentistry at UWC, serving from the University of Stellenbosch, Prof HS Breytenbach, commenced duty on July 1, 1974. The symbiotic relationship between the two sister faculties continued up to 1992 when UWC moved to its new premises at Mitchell's Plein. During this time, former president Nelson Mandela was a regular visitor for dental care to the Oral and Dental Teaching Hospital at Tygerberg during his stay at Robben Island Prison. Later, in 2004, the faculties of dentistry at UWC and Stellenbosch universities merged to form the combined Faculty of Dentistry at the University of the Western Cape as we know today.

== Campuses and facilities ==
The Faculty of Dentistry is located over three campuses, and training is undertaken on the Oral Health Provincial Teaching Platform, including the Groote Schuur and Red Cross Children's Hospitals.

Main Campus
The University of the Western Cape's main campus is situated in Bellville. Subjects such as public health, physics and chemistry in the dental degree are typically taught on main campus.

Tygerberg Hospital Campus
The Tygerberg Campus and Oral Health Center is located at and beside Tygerberg Hospital in Belville, Cape Town, roughly 8 kilometers from main campus. The Tygerberg Campus is a principal teaching hospital. The office of the Dean and deputy deans and manager of oral health services are located here.

Mitchell's Plain Campus
Other lecturers and administrative staff are based at the Mitchell's Plain Campus, situated approximately 20 kilometers from the main campus in the residential suburb of Mitchell's Plain. The Mitchell's Plain campus at the Melomed Center is a principal teaching hospital, with the state of the art virtual-patient lab.

Virtual-patient training technology at the Mitchells Plain lab

Groote Schuur Hospital
Groote Schuur Hospital, home of the world's first heart transplant, is located in the center of Cape Town, and trains dental students in several disciplines namely oral and maxillofacial surgery, general surgery, internal medicine, etc.

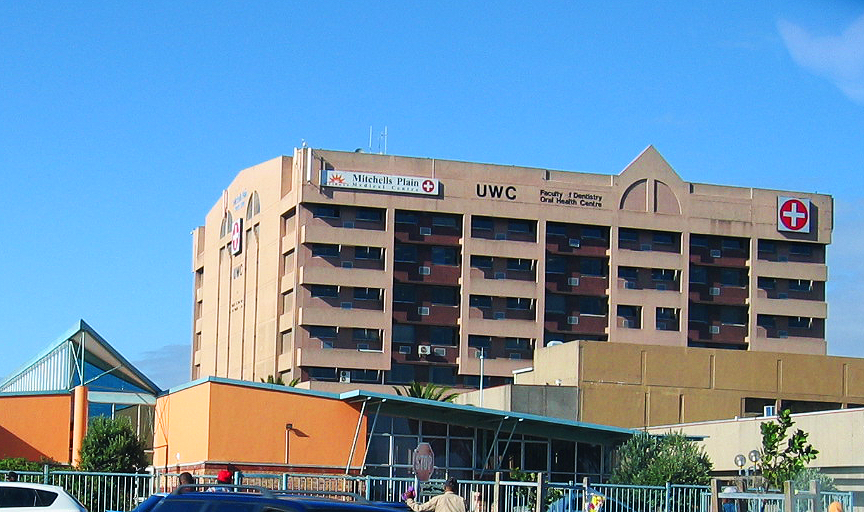
UWC Oral Health Center at Mitchells Plain

Red Cross Children's Hospital
Red Cross Children's Hospital is a specialist pediatric referral hospital, training students from the University of Cape Town's medical school, University of the Western Cape's Dental School, and the University of Stellenbosch. The hospital is located in Rondebosch, Cape Town, in the vicinity of Groote Schuur Hospital.

== Degrees and diplomas ==
For full details, see the Faculty of Dentistry's 2015 yearbook UWC Faculty of Dentistry Yearbook 2015 | Dental Degree | Dental Hygienist

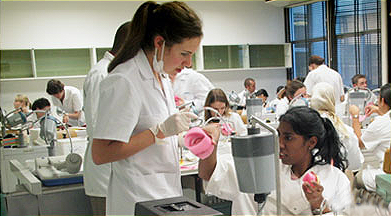

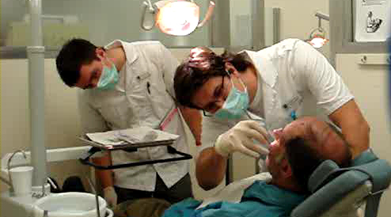

- Baccalaureus Chirurgiae Dentium (BChD)
- Baccalaureus Oral Health (B OH)
- Magister Scientiae (Dentium) MSc(Dent)
- Magister Chirurgiae Dentium MChD (OKA MDS)
- Philosophiae Doctor PhD
- Doctor Science in Odontology DSc (Odont)

Diplomas

Postgraduate Diploma in Dentistry (PDD):

- PDD Aesthetic Dentistry
- PDD Endodontics
- PDD Forensic Dentistry
- PDD Implantology
- PDD Interceptive Orthodontics
- PDD Maxillofacial Radiology
- PDD Minor Oral Surgery
- PDD Oral Pathology
- PDD Paediatric Dentistry
- PDD Sedation and Pain Control

Syllabi for MSC Degree

- MSc (Dent) (Dental Public Health)
- MSc (Dent) (Forensic Dentistry)
- MSc (Dent) (Maxillofacial Radiology)
- MSc (Dent) (Oral Medicine)
- MSc (Dent) (Periodontology)
- MSc (Dent) (Oral Medicine & Periodontology)
- MSc (Dent) (Oral Pathology)
- MSc (Dent) (Paediatric Dentistry)
- MSc (Dent) (Restorative Dentistry)

Syllabi for Specialist MChD Degree

- MChD (Community Dentistry)
- MChD (Maxillofacial & Oral Surgery)
- MChD (Oral Medicine and Periodontics)
- MChD (Orthodontics)
- MChD (Oral Pathology)
- MChD (Prosthodontics)

== Notable alumni & staff ==
- Prof. Jairam Reddy, ex-Dean, ex-vice chancellor of the University of Durban-Westville, chair of the National Commission on Higher Education of South Africa
- Prof. C J Nortje, current Professor of Oral Maxillofacial Radiology, Treasurer, Past President of International Association of DentoMaxilloFacial Radiology (IADMFR) and International editor for DentoMaxilloFacial Radiology (DMFR)Journal.
- Prof. M E Parker, current Deputy Dean and Professor of Oral Maxillofacial Radiology and Secretary General of International Association of DentoMaxilloFacial Radiology (IADMFR)
- Prof. A G Farman, ex-Professor and currently Professor at School of Dentistry, University of Louisville, Kentucky
- Prof. J J Hille, current Professor of Oral Pathology, Treasurer South African Head and Neck Oncology Society (SAHNOS)
- Prof. M H Hobdell, ex-Dean and currently Professor of Dental Public Health at University College London (UCL)
- Prof Mervyn Shear, Extraordinary Professor and Professor Emeritus, author of 5 books.
- Prof Sudeshni Naidoo, Senior Professor UWC Faculty of Dentistry, NRF rated researcher, Deputy Dean for Research, President of the South African Division of the IADR, Director of the World Health Organisation (WHO) Collaborating Centre for Oral Health
- Prof Wendy McMillan, Education Advisor to the UWC Faculty of Dentistry, education degree holder, Honours in curriculum, PhD in educational sociology, a substantially published author in health sciences education, ex South African Association of Health Educationists (SAAHE) National Chair, currently AAHE Council Representative, recipient of the SAAHE distinguished educator award 2012, African Journal of Health Professions Education Editorial Board member.
