= Peter Buschang =

American orthodontist

Peter H. Buschang
- Born: June 23, 1951 (age 74); Cologne, Germany
- Education: University of Texas at Austin
- Known for: Earl E. and Wilma Award Recipient, Honorary member of American Association of Orthodontists

Peter H. Buschang (born 1951) is an anthropologist, an orthodontic researcher and an orthodontic educator. He is also an honorary member of American Association of Orthodontics and Edward H. Angle Society of Orthodontists.

== Life ==
Buschang graduated Phi Beta Kappa and received his bachelor's degree in physical anthropology in 1976 from the University of Texas at Austin, followed by his master's degree in primate anatomy in 1978. In 1980, he obtained his PhD in physical anthropology, also from the University of Texas at Austin. He then spent three years as a NIDCR postdoctoral fellow at University of Connecticut School of Dental Medicine, Department of Orthodontics, followed by five years at Université de Montréal's Human Growth Research Center. In 1988, he joined Texas A&M University Baylor College of Dentistry, where he currently serves as a Regents Professor and director of the orthodontic research program.

== Orthodontics ==
Buschang's research interests focus on craniofacial growth, developmental adaptations to orthodontic and surgical treatments, and oral-motor function. He has published over 256 scientific papers and has given more than 130 invited lectures and workshops. There is a Peter H. Buschang Endowed Professorship in Orthodontic in his name at the Texas A&M University Baylor College of Dentistry. He's also written two textbooks, entitled Clinical Research Methodology and Design for Dentists: Practical Guidelines and Applications ISBN 9781607974178 and Recognizing and Correcting Developing Malocclusions: A Problem-Oriented Approach to Orthodontics.

== Awards & positions ==
- Earle E. and Wilma Shepard Award
- American Association of Orthodontists – honorary member
- Edward H. Angle Society of Orthodontics – honorary member
- Director of Orthodontic Research at Department of Orthodontics, Baylor College of Dentistry – 1989–present
- Regents Professor, Baylor College of Dentistry, 2012–present
