= University of Connecticut Department of Periodontology =

U.S. University department

Coordinates: 41.7308°N 72.7903°W

The Department of Periodontology is a division of the University of Connecticut School of Dental Medicine Department of Oral Health and Diagnostic Sciences. It carries out research and offers training for pre-doctoral and postgraduate students.

== History ==
The School of Dental Medicine was established at the University of Connecticut Health Center in Farmington during the 1960s. The school's John Dempsey Hospital was opened in Farmington in 1975. The School of Dental Medicine has seven speciality programs. The Department of Periodontology has made significant contributions to dentistry in general and periodontology in particular.

== Research ==
The major research areas in the department include: pathogenesis of oral opportunistic infections in the immunocompromised host; inflammation biology, cytokine biology, pathogenesis of periodontal inflammation in chronic periodontitis; the interrelationship between periodontal inflammation and chronic systemic inflammatory disorders, such as atherosclerosis; and clinical research in oral implantology.

== Postgraduate training ==
The department of Periodontology offers advanced training in basic sciences relevant to periodontology and clinical management of periodontal diseases. The philosophy of the Division encompasses varied approaches to the treatment of periodontal disease and the staff consists of individuals with a broad cross-section of necessary training and skills, including implantology and guided tissue regeneration techniques.

The Division offers:

- A 36-month clinically oriented program leading to a Certificate of Proficiency in Periodontology.
- A 36-month clinical and research program leading to a Certificate and M.Dent.Sc. degree.
- A 60-plus month clinical and research program leading to a Certificate and Ph.D. degree in Biomedical Sciences.

Division courses include weekly literature review seminars and case conferences. Interdepartmental courses include oral anatomy, dental microbiology, connective tissue biology, minor tooth movement, TMJ seminar, dental pharmacotherapeutics, and general and oral pathology. Interdisciplinary courses include seminars with orthodontics and endodontics. These didactic elements are combined with five half-days of supervised patient care per week. A one-month general anesthesia rotation is provided.

The graduate residency program offers training in Periodontology and Implant dentistry.

== Staff ==
The current department chair and graduate program director is Dr. Anna Dongari-Bagtzoglou.
