= UT Health San Antonio School of Dentistry =

Public dental school in San Antonio, Texas

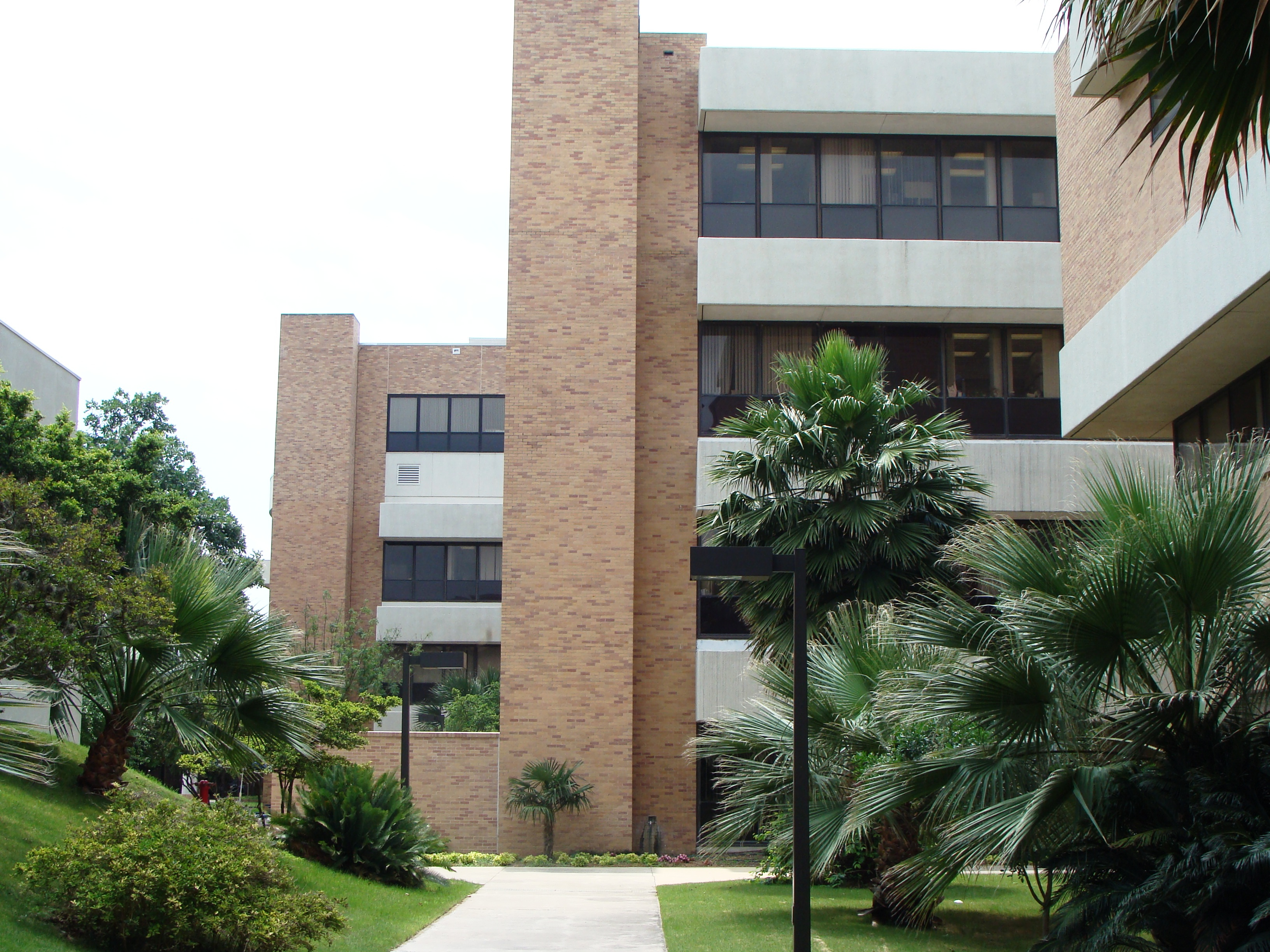
- UT Health San Antonio School of Dentistry
- Type: Public
- Established: 1970
- Dean: Peter M. Loomer, BSc, DDS, PhD, MRCD(C), FACD
- Undergraduates: 390 students (2009) (Dental School)
- Postgraduates: 79 students (2009) (Advanced Dental Education)
- Location: San Antonio, , Texas,, USA; 29.507505°N 98.575354°W
- Website: dental.uthscsa.edu
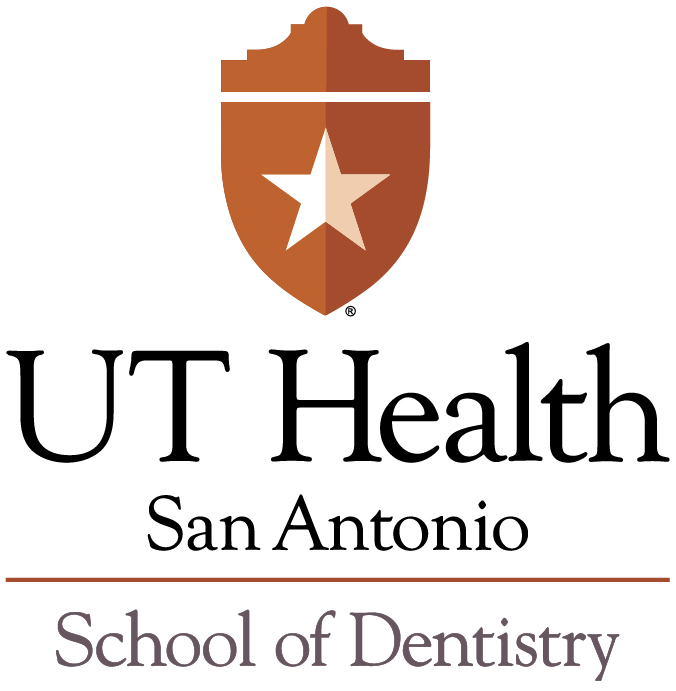

The UT Health San Antonio School of Dentistry, often abbreviated UTHSCSA Dental, is one of four dental schools in the state of Texas. It is located on the main campus of University of Texas Health Science Center at San Antonio in San Antonio, Texas.

Although a relatively young school in the country, the institute has managed to climb to renowned status in a very short time. In the last ranking of U.S. News & World Report which was published in 1996, the school was ranked at #1.

Each year, over 90 students graduate from the DDS program at the UTHSCSA.

== Education ==
With nearly 200 dedicated research faculty members in 10 fields of study, the school offers various degrees, including dual doctorates.

Areas of focus are:

- Community Dentistry
- Comprehensive Dentistry
- Dental diagnostic science
- Endodontics
- General dentistry
- Oral and maxillofacial surgery
- Orthodontics
- Pediatric dentistry
- Periodontics
- Prosthodontics
- Restorative dentistry

== Research and publication ==
The Dental School at the Health Science Center ranked fourth in publications and 11th in scientific impact among the world's 760 dental schools from 1998 to 2002.

Faculty in this school developed the first digital panoramic x-ray device in America.

== See also ==
- American Student Dental Association
