= Oral and maxillofacial radiology =

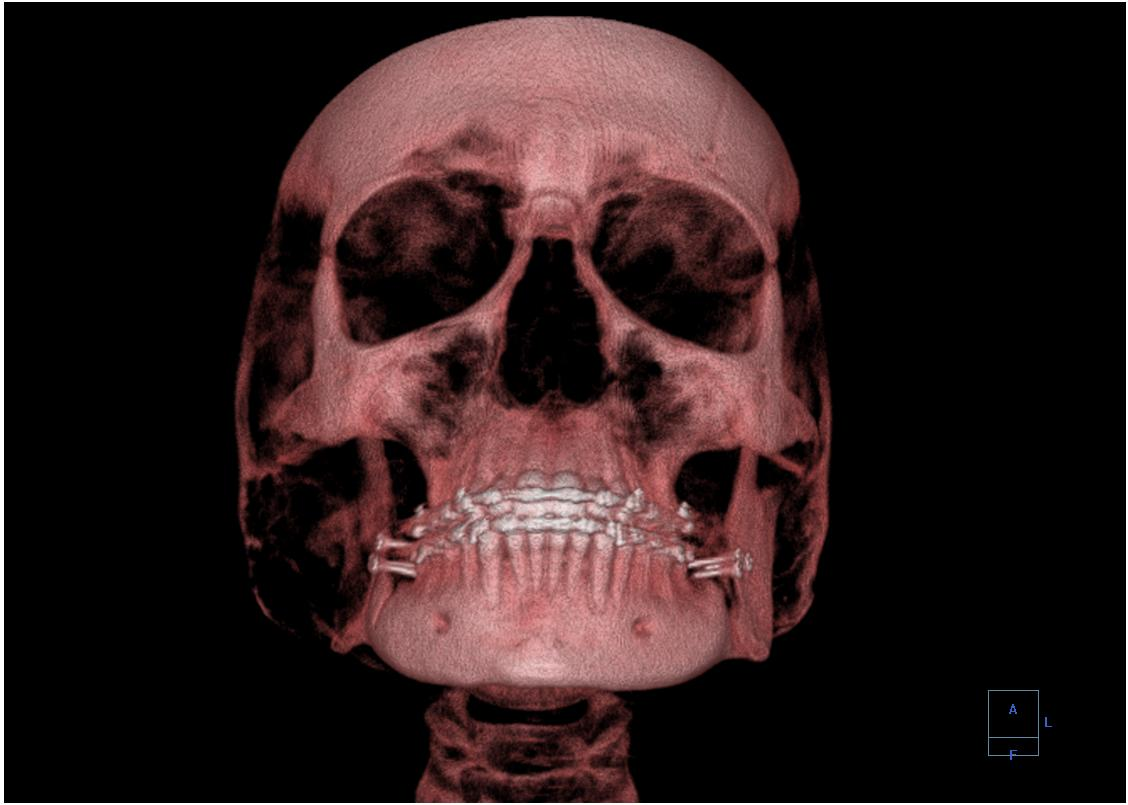
ConeBeam computerized tomography image of a post-operative orthognathic surgery

Oral and maxillofacial radiology, also known as dental and maxillofacial radiology, or even more common DentoMaxilloFacial Radiology, is the specialty of dentistry concerned with performance and interpretation of diagnostic imaging used for examining the craniofacial, dental and adjacent structures.

Oral and maxillofacial imaging includes cone beam computerized tomography, multislice computerized tomography, magnetic resonance imaging, positron emission tomography, ultrasound, panoramic radiography, cephalometric imaging, intra-oral imaging (e.g. bitewing, peri-apical and occlusal radiographs) in addition to special tests like sialographs. Other modalities, including optical coherence tomography are also under development for dental imaging.

The first point of focus of oral, dental and maxillofacial radiology is to identify the problem from the patient's complaints. All areas of the mouth and teeth are examined, not just existing complaints, and problems arising in these areas are referred for treatment without causing more serious problems in the future. Therefore, early detection of disorders and the application of protective and some preventive methods can prevent various disorders that may develop and make the treatment process easier and simpler.

Radiologic methods of research are leading in the diagnosis of diseases of the maxillofacial region, which is due to their reliability and informativeness. For example, the CBCT scanning protocol is a valuable examination tool in oral and maxillofacial radiology and is available in dental offices because of its ease of use. X-ray diagnostic methods are widely used in the practice of therapeutic dentistry (to detect peri- and periodontal diseases); in orthopedic dentistry (to assess the condition of preserved teeth, periapical tissues, periodontium, which determines the choice of orthopedic measures). Radiological methods are also in demand in maxillofacial surgery in the diagnosis of traumatic injuries, inflammatory diseases, cysts, tumors and other pathological conditions. The methodology and technique of radiologic examination of teeth and jaws has its own peculiarities.

== Training ==
=== United States ===
Oral or dental maxillofacial radiology is one of nine dental specialties recognized by the American Dental Association.

To become an oral and maxillofacial radiologist one must first complete a dental degree and then apply for and complete a postgraduate course of training (usually between 2–4 years in length). Training includes all aspects of radiation physics, radiation biology, radiation safety, radiologic technique, the patho-physiology of disease and interpretation of diagnostic images.

The Commission on Dental Accreditation accredited programs are a minimum of two years in length. Several accredited programs in oral maxillofacial radiology require the resident to complete a master's degree, whereas others allow the option of pursuing a concurrent PhD or master's degree. Following successful completion of this training the Oral and Maxillofacial Radiologist becomes Board eligible to challenge the American Board of Oral and Maxillofacial Radiology examination. Successful completion of board certification results in Diplomat status in the American Board of Oral and Maxillofacial Radiology.

=== Australia ===
Australian programs are accredited by the Australian Dental Council and are 3 years in length, culminating in either a master's degree (MDS or MPhil) or a Doctor of Clinical Dentistry degree (DClinDent). Currently, the only Australian institution offering specialist training in oral maxillofacial radiology is the University of Queensland. Programs are focused on clinical radiology and offer comprehensive training with registrars reporting plain film, cone beam computerized tomography, multislice computerized tomography and magnetic resonance imaging of the maxillofacial region.

Fellowship can then be acquired through the Royal Australia New Zealand College of Radiologists and/or the Royal Australasian College of Dental Surgeons. Oral and maxillofacial radiologists in Australia tend to work in the private sector, reporting in medical radiology practices alongside medical radiologists.

=== Canada ===
Canadian programs are accredited by the Canadian Dental Association and are a minimum of two years in length and usually culminate with a Master of Science degree. Graduates are then eligible to sit for the Fellowship exams with the Royal College of Dentists of Canada.

=== United Kingdom ===
Programs in the United Kingdom are 4 years in length and culminate in a Certificate in Completion of Specialty Training and often a Master of Science degree. Graduates are then eligible to sit for the Diploma of Dental Radiology from the Royal College of Radiologists.

=== Hungary ===
In Hungary, to obtain a specialization license in dento-maxillo-facial radiology, radiologist qualification or specialist dentist qualification is required. The duration of the training is 8 months for a dentist, and 12 months for a radiologist.
