= Christoffel Nortje =

South African dentist

Christoffel Nortje is a South African dentist who is emeritus professor of oral and maxillofacial radiology at the Department of Diagnostics and Radiology at the University of the Western Cape, Faculty of Dentistry in Cape Town, South Africa. He was in private practice prior to joining the Department of Diagnostics and Radiology at Stellenbosch University, where he headed the department until 2005.

He obtained his PhD from the University of Pretoria and was promoted to professor in 1979. He was the first recipient of the Vice-Chancellor's award for Excellence in Research in Dentistry at Stellenbosch University and also received an honorary doctorate (DSc) from the University of Pretoria in South Africa. He is a diplomate of the American Board of Oral and Maxillofacial Radiology.

Nortje is a past president of the International Association of Dento-Maxillofacial Radiology, the South African division of the International Association for Dental Research (IADR), The South African Society of Maxillofacial Radiology and the South African Society for Forensic Odontology.

He has contributed to more than 200 scientific publications & 50 research abstracts, co-authored three textbooks, contributed to four textbooks and was an invited author in Oral and Maxillofacial Surgery Clinics of America on 1992, 2002, and 2003. He is one of the authors of what is considered to be the "Bible" of Oral and Maxillofacial Radiology at the turn of the 21st century, Diagnostic Imaging of the Jaws, by R.P. Langlais, Olaf E. Langland, and C.J. Nortje.

Nortje has been the author of the South African Dental Journal column "Radiology Corner" for a number of years. He has also been the promoter of 2 DSc, 3 PhD, 2 MSc and co-promoter of 2 PhD degrees.

Nortje has spoken extensively in maxillofacial radiology scientific meetings in Hungary, Italy, United States, Brazil, Abu Dhabi, Lebanon, Bangkok, Thailand, China, Namibia and Zimbabwe. He is on the Editorial Boards of the Journal of Dento-Maxillofacial Radiology, The Journal of Forensic Odonto Stomatology, The Journal of Oral Surgery, Oral Medicine and Oral Pathology and the South African Dental Journal.
