= Bocage (disambiguation) =

Bocage is a type of French countryside.

Bocage may also refer to:

- Villers-Bocage, Calvados, a commune in North-western France
- Villers-Bocage, Somme, a commune in Northern France
- Manuel Maria Barbosa du Bocage (1765–1805), Portuguese poet
- Bocage (actor) (1801–1862), French actor
- José Vicente Barbosa du Bocage (1823–1907), Portuguese zoologist and politician
- Angela Bocage (born 1959), American comics artist
