= Buccal object rule =

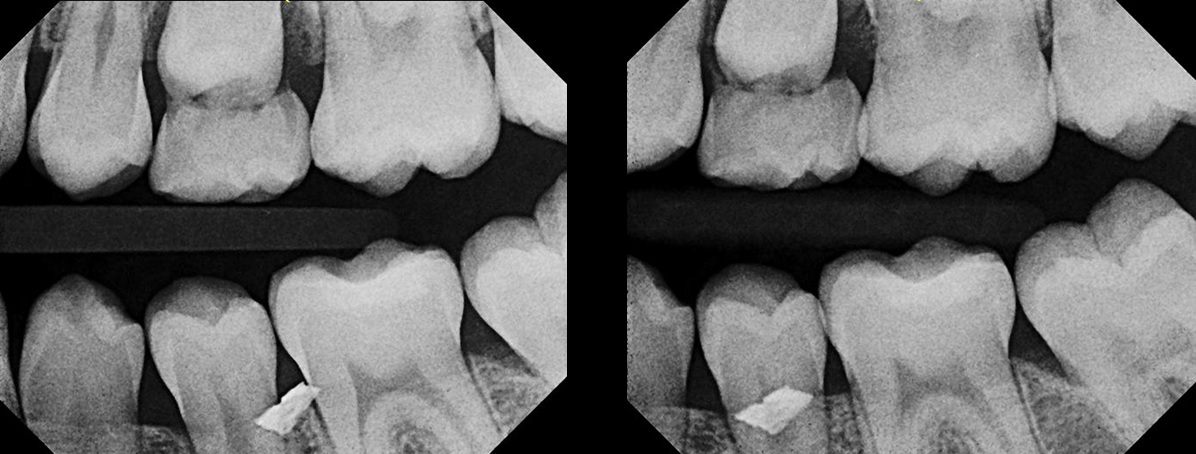
The initial radiograph (left) indicated that a metal foreign object was embedded somewhere in or near the teeth, but upon clinical examination, it could not be found anywhere in the gum tissue. Upon taking another radiograph (right) exposed at a very severe distal angulation, however, the metal fragment appeared to move a great deal to superimpose on the facial aspect of the premolar, indicating that the fragment was way more buccal than initially suspected. With the use of this second film, it was determined that the metal fragment was indeed embedded in the cheek.

The buccal object/SLOB rule is a method used to determine the relative position of two objects in the oral cavity using projectional dental radiography.

== Clark's Rule ==
In 1909, Charles A. Clark described a radiographic procedure for localizing impacted teeth to determining their relative antero-posterior position. If the two teeth (or, by extension, any two objects, such as a tooth and a foreign object) are located in front of one another relative to the x-ray beam, they will appear superimposed on one another on a dental radiograph, but it will be impossible to know which one is in front of the other. To determine which is in front and which is behind, Clark proposed his SLOB rule, as a complicated set of three radiographs, but which can be simplified as follows using just two:

Expose another film while angle of the x-ray beam has been changed. If an object moves in the same direction as the source of the x-ray beam, it is lingual to the other object. If the object moves in the opposite direction of the source, it is buccal to the other object.

Same Lingual; Opposite Buccal

== SLOB rule in Dentistry Video Tutorial ==
The video below shows a 5 minute illustration describing SLOB rule in dentistry

https://www.youtube.com/embed/AzjvFPlZtZg

== Buccal Object Rule ==
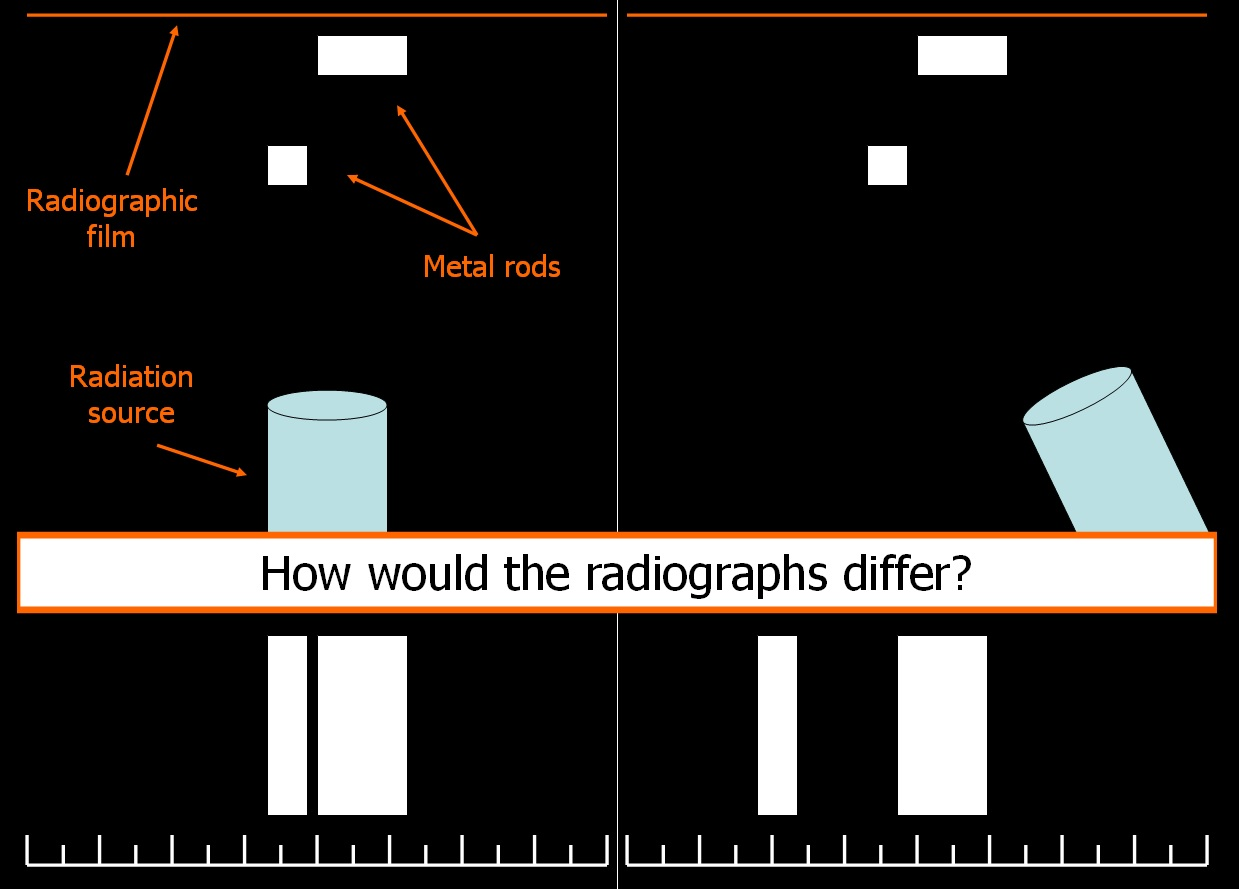
Diagrammatic representation of the buccal object rule being employed. In the first radiograph (left), the objects appear on the film in almost the same relationship that they share in reality. But by shifting the x-ray collimator (radiation source) to one side and tilting it towards the objects (right), the objects appear on the film in a distorted relationship. The object closer to the x-ray collimator (generally the buccal object) will appear to reposition itself on the film at a greater distance than the object farther from the collimator (generally the lingual object) and it will appear to shift on the film in the direction of the beam.

In 1952, Richards amended this rule using only 2 radiographs, asserting that the object positioned more buccally will move more relative to the object positioned more palatally or lingually.

As a generalization, but not specifically stated as part of Richards' buccal object rule, the more buccal an object is (i.e. the closer it is to the x-ray source) the more it will move in the second radiograph when repositioning the x-ray source.

At the University of Alabama School of Dentistry, this rule is referred to as the BAMA rule: buccal always moves away.
