= University of Connecticut School of Dental Medicine =

Dental school in Farmington, Connecticut, US

Coordinates: 41.7308°N 72.7903°W

- Type: Public university
- Established: 1968
- Dean: Steven Lepowsky
- Location: Farmington, Connecticut, U.S.
- Website: dentalmedicine.uconn.edu
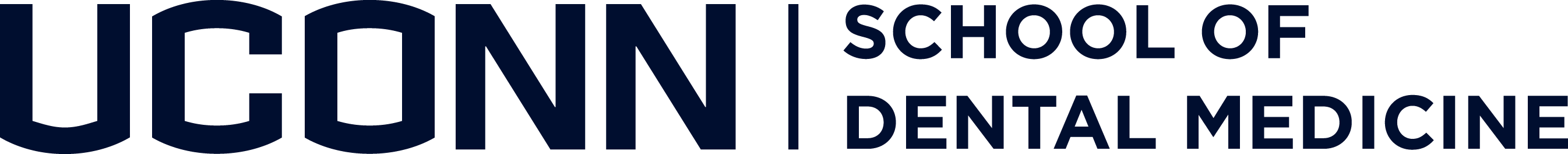

University of Connecticut School of Dental Medicine is a school of dentistry located at the UConn Health Center in Farmington, Connecticut, United States. The school is often placed highly in national rankings, and was ranked #1 by the National Board Dental Examiners in 2001 based on the board scores of students. During the 2013-2014 application year, approximately 1,300 applications were received. Of these, 160 were interviewed and offers were eventually made to approximately 80, for an acceptance rate of around 6%.

== Departments ==
University of Connecticut School of Dental Medicine includes the following departments:

- Department of Oral Health and Diagnostic Sciences
- Department of Reconstructive Sciences
- Department of Craniofacial Sciences

Department of Craniofacial Sciences include the divisions of Oral and Maxillofacial Surgery, Pediatric Dentistry, Advanced Education in General Dentistry, and Orthodontics.

== Accreditation ==
University of Connecticut School of Dental Medicine is currently accredited by the ADA.

== See also ==
- University of Connecticut Department of Periodontology
