= Dental aerosol =

Hazardous biological compound

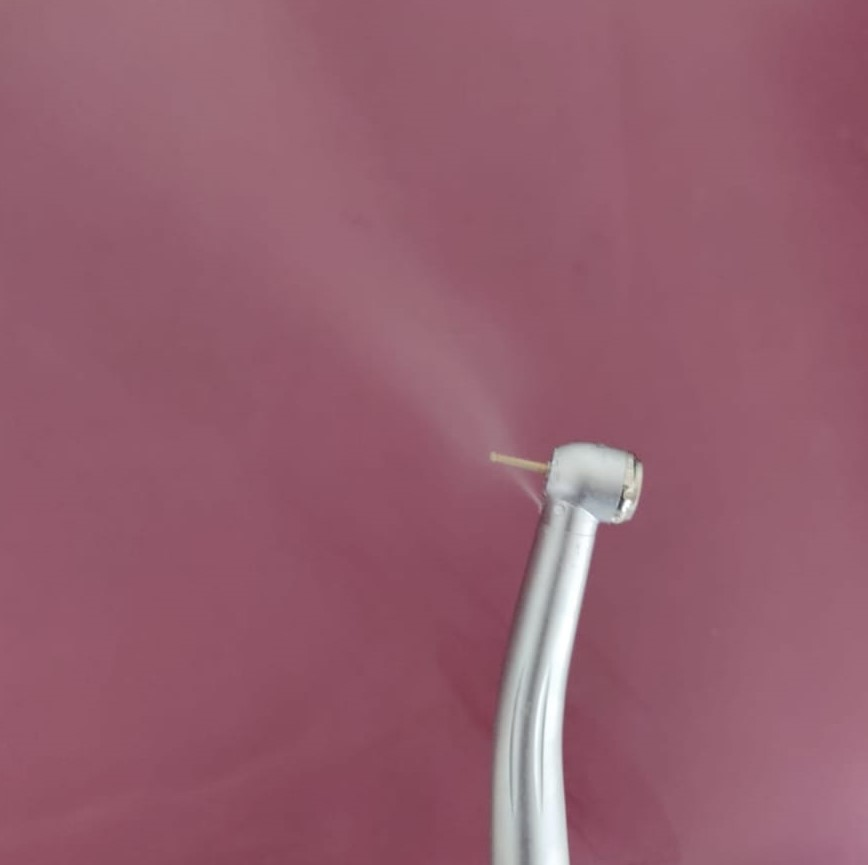
Dental aerosol from a dental hand piece

A dental aerosol is an aerosol that is produced from dental instrument, dental handpieces, three-way syringes, and other high-speed instruments. These aerosols may remain suspended in the clinical environment. Dental aerosols can pose risks to the clinician, staff, and other patients. The heavier particles (e.g., >50 μm) contained within the aerosols are likely to remain suspended in the air for relatively short period and settle quickly onto surfaces, however, the lighter particles may remain suspended for longer periods and may travel some distance from the source. These smaller particles are capable of becoming deposited in the lungs when inhaled and provide a route of diseases transmission. Different dental instruments produce varying quantities of aerosol, and therefore are likely to pose differing risks of dispersing microbes from the mouth. Air turbine dental handpieces generally produce more aerosol, with electric micromotor handpieces producing less, although this depends on the configuration of water coolant used by the handpiece.

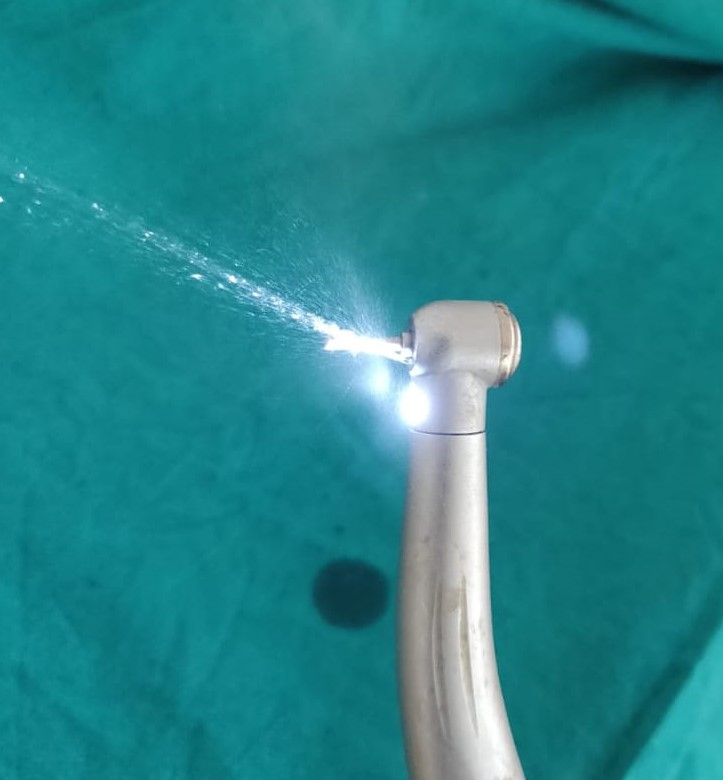
Spatter and aerosols flushing out of dental hand piece

== Composition ==
These dental aerosols are bioaerosols which may be contaminated with bacteria, fungi, and viruses from the oral cavity, skin, and the water used in dental units. Dental aerosols also have micro-particles from dental burs, and silica particles which are one of the components of dental filling materials like dental composite. Depending upon the procedure and site, the aerosol composition may change from patient to patient. Apart from microorganisms, these aerosols may consist of particles from saliva, gingival crevicular fluid, blood, dental plaque, calculus, tooth debris, oronasal secretions, oil from dental handpieces, and micro-particles from grinding of the teeth and dental materials. They may also consist of abrasive particles that are expelled during air abrasion and polishing methods.

== Size ==
Dental aerosols contain a wide range of particles with the majority being less than 50 μm. The smaller particles with size between 0.5 and 10 μm are more likely to be inhaled and have the potential to transmit infection. Smaller particles are likely to remain suspended for longer periods of time, and may travel further from the source. Settling time of particles is described by Stokes' law in part as a function of their aerodynamic diameter.

== Potential hazards and mitigation ==
The water used in the dental units may be contaminated with Legionella, and the aerosols produced by dental handpieces may contribute to the spread of the Legionella in the environment; there is therefore a risk of inhalation by the dentist, staff and patients. The dental unit water lines (DUWLs) may also be contaminated with other bacteria like Mycobacterium spp and Pseudomonas aeruginosa. Infection from Legionella species causes infections like Legionellosis and several pneumonia like diseases. However, still there is no strong evidence that suggests the dentists are at greater occupational risk from Legionella. Transmission of tuberculosis also occurs from the cough producing procedures on the patients with tuberculosis that involve production of aerosols. Mycobacterium tuberculosis is transmitted in the form of droplet nuclei which are smaller than 5 μm which stay suspended in the environment for longer duration. The development of active tuberculosis in Dental Health Care Workers (DHCWs) is less likely than the rest of the other Health Care Workers (HCWs). There are lacking evidences to prove the active tuberculosis development resulting from this transmission in Dental health care Workers (DHCWs).

The virus that caused the COVID-19 pandemic is named as severe acute respiratory syndrome coronavirus 2 (SARS-CoV-2) by the International Committee on Taxonomy of Viruses (ICTV) on 11 February 2020. SARS-CoV-2 remains stable in aerosols for several hours. The virus is viable for hours in aerosols and for few days on surfaces, hence the transmission of SARS-CoV-2 is feasible through aerosols and also shows fomite transmission.

Dentists have previously been described as one of the top of the working groups with high risk of exposure to SARS-CoV-2. Due to the close proximity of the dental health care workers to the patients, dental procedures involving aerosol production is not advisable in patients who tested positive for COVID-19 except for emergency dental treatment. On 16 March 2020, the American Dental Association (ADA) has advised dentists to postpone all elective procedures. ADA also developed guidance specific to address dental services during the COVID-19 pandemic.

Elements like calcium, aluminium, silica and phosphorus can also be found in the dental aerosols produced during the procedures like debonding of orthodontic appliances. These particles may range from 2 to 30 μm in diameter and there are chances of inhaling them.

A number of methods have been proposed, and are widely used, to control dental aerosols and reduce risk of disease transmission. For example, dental aerosols can be controlled or reduced using dental suction, rubber dam, alternative handpieces, and local exhaust ventilation (extra-oral suction).

== See also ==
- Occupational hazards in dentistry
- Dentistry
