= Eco-friendly dentistry =

Sustainability trend in dental services

Eco-friendly dentistry (also called environmentally friendly dentistry, green dentistry or sustainable dentistry) aims at reducing the detrimental impact of dental services on the environment while still being able to adhere to the regulations and standards of the dental industries in their respective countries.

There are no official governing agencies that certify an office as meeting eco-friendly standards. Dental offices in the United States of America can be recognised as eco-friendly offices by becoming members of the Eco Dentistry Association. Within England there are audit programmes available from the National Union of Students such as the Green Impact tool. People who want to be involved and discuss sustainable dentistry in a free and open forum are invited to be members at the Centre for Sustainable Healthcare.

== History ==
The term "eco-friendly dentistry" was first coined by Dr. Gorankralj and Dr. Steven Koos. These two men, in December 2009, defined it as a new practice within dentistry that combines prevention, sustainability, and an overall minimally invasive approach focused on the patient resulting in a more positive impact on the environment. It has roots originating from the environmental movement and environmentalism, which, in the Western world, is often perceived as having begun in the 1960s and 1970s. The rise of this movement is often credited to Rachel Carson, conservationist and author of the book Silent Spring. Subsequently, legislation in many countries throughout the world began gaining momentum in the 1970s and continues to the present day.

Eco-friendliness also has meaning in another context as a marketing term. It is used by companies to appeal to consumers of goods and services as having a low impact on the environment. Market research has found that an increasing number of consumers purchase goods and services that appeal to the values of environmental philosophy.

The term has been criticised as being used for "greenwashing", which is the practice of deceptively promoting a product or service as environmentally friendly. Legislation in countries around the world have Trade Commissions and such to stop companies profiting with baseless claims on their goods and services. Individuals and bodies that work in the dental industry have also subsequently adopted the principles of sustainability and environmentalism and also as an advertisement to patients, clients and consumers. The Eco Dentistry Association is an accreditation organisation in the United States which has proposed outcomes towards becoming more sustainable.

In 2008, the Eco Dentistry Association (EDA) was co-founded by Dr. Fred Pockrass and his wife, Ina Pockrass. The EDA provides "education, standards and connection" to patients and dentists who practice green dentistry. The EDA aims to help dentists "come up with safe and reusable alternatives that lower a dentists' operating cost by replacing paper with digital media whenever possible." As of February 2011, the EDA has approximately 600 members. After the inception of the EDA, the dental industry in America saw more dentists and oral surgeons choosing to make their offices environmentally friendly.

In 2011, The Australian Dental Association implemented a policy of sustainability to provide guidelines to assist in the environmental sustainability of dental offices in Australia. In August 2017 the FDA adopted a sustainability in dentistry policy.

=== Material history ===
There were many med-tech advances made in the 20th century that helped change the way that the world approaches dentistry. The first was the creation of the high-speed dental drill as well as X-ray machines which revolutionized how dentists diagnosed and treated patients. These innovations also allowed dentists to work faster, efficiently, and more precisely. The negative environmental impacts of these products were overlooked because of the major benefit they provided to the medical industry.

In the 1940s, fluoride was researched and was then used in public water supplies when researchers learned that fluoride helps prevent cavities. This preventative measure remains one of the most positive impacts for oral health and the environment. Having less patients with cavities means less appointments where unnecessary equipment and car fuel are used.

Another innovation in dentistry with a positive environmental impact is the use of CAD/CAM technology. Practitioners with appointments for crowns, dentures, and other prosthetics for patients use CAD/CAM software. These complex programs allow practitioners to visualize and precisely measure teeth height and gum depth for the perfect prosthetic to be made. Although CNC and lathing machines do generate particles of plastic and/or resin, CAD/CAM technology has decreased the number of necessary impressions, which create more waste and are not as precise.

In the 21st century, a recent change in the industry positively impacting the environment has been teledentistry. This concept can be helpful for diagnosis, treatment plan monitoring, emergency situations, among others, especially in rural areas where people need to drive more than 30 minutes to their dentist.

== Elements of eco-friendly dentistry ==
There is a growing amount of scientific information regarding the carbon footprint of the dental industry. These include papers by Duane relating to work carried out in Scotland and more recently England.

Recently, Public Health England published a report on the carbon footprint of NHS England dentistry. The report based on 2014 data provides a number of recommendations for the dental team in England to consider. The report demonstrated the considerable contribution of staff and patient travel to the overall carbon footprint.

To be environmentally responsible, offices can incorporate the four R's of environmental responsibility. The four R's are: reduce, reuse, recycle and rethink.

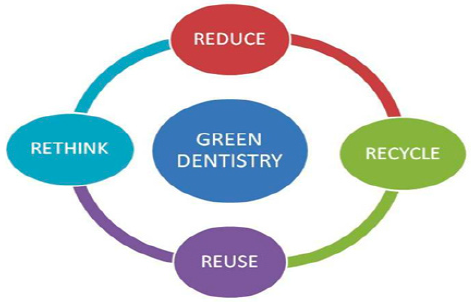
The 4 R's of environmental responsibility

=== Reduce ===
Having a paperless dental office reduces or eliminates the use of paper by going digital. This involves converting patient files, medical histories and other documentation to an electronic system. Going paperless not only makes information sharing easier and accessible, but is an efficient way of keeping personal information secure. This saves money, boosts productivity and saves space, as there is no need for any filing cabinets, and is a great way of ensuring clinical records are more accurate. Using digital radiography allows to keep all the patients' records in one spot, reduces the amount of radiation exposure and images and clinical photographs can be shared without losing the quality of the image.

=== Reuse ===
==== Clean water ====
In many countries around the world there are strict mandatory limits on the use of mercury and the levels found in wastewater.

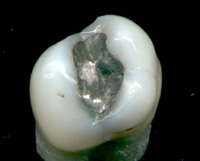
Amalgam

Mercury is traditionally used in dental restorations known as amalgam. In October 2013, Australia's Department of the Environment and Energy signed The Minamata Convention in a call for the reduction of amalgam usage by means of nine measures aiming to eventually phase out the use of amalgam. Mercury can be released into the environment when amalgam is placed, finished and polished or removed from a patient mouth and can be either rinsed into sewage systems or disposed of in landfill. By complying with the Australian Dental Association (ADA) Policy 6.11 and the current edition of the International Organization for Standardization ISO11143 Dentistry – Amalgam Separators, reducing the amount of mercury entering the environment by means of installing amalgam separators and traps to collect and separate amalgam waste before it enters the sewage system. Amalgam that is collected from traps is then collected and recycled for reuse.

With the phasing out of manual processing of radiographs and switching to digital radiography allows for offices not having to purchase developing liquids and these liquids are harmful to the environment and need to be collected to be disposed of correctly.

==== Water management ====
• Installing a water meter to monitor water usage.
• Handwashing sinks with motion-activated taps.
• Collect the water bills for the last year to benchmark a water usage audit.
• Place interpretive signs about water conservation in staff rooms, toilets and surgeries.
• Maintain and repair taps or fittings.
• Use a non-water-based approach to cleaning where possible.
• Retro flow controllers in key usage areas.
• Install 4-, 5- or 6-star water efficient appliances where appropriate.

=== Recycle ===
Dental practices can recycle paper, cardboard, aluminum and plastics from plastic barriers and other water products contributing to sustainable environmentally friendly practices. Autoclave bags can be separated after opening and the paper and plastic recycled separately.

To become more eco-friendly or environmentally friendly dental practices can purchase biodegradable products therefore allowing more waste associated with the running of the practice to be recycled. Shredding of paper documents and recycling shredded paper will contribute to sustainable practices.

=== Rethink ===
Across all dental practices, there can be certain waste practices or other areas that can be rethought for a better environmental impact. This framework encompasses the mindset of how and where clinics source, use, and dispose of all materials. Small changes can be implemented that reduce the amount of paper waste such as moving towards more digital files or using non-toxic cleaners rather than environmentally damaging products. When several options are available, they are encouraged to choose the most environmentally friendly option. Options can range from environmentally responsible manufacturing, minimal packaging, or reusability within the equipment's lifetime. The Rethink framework of dentistry also means thinking about environmental impact before patients come to the office. An example of this is offering online consultations called teledentistry can reduce unnecessary driving emissions and in-office equipement usage.

== Limitations ==
=== Low implementation despite awareness ===
Based on studies done in 13 different schools in the United Kingdom, about 97.3% of dental students believe that the dental industry should be more active in making the industry more sustainable. The problem is that the majority of these students do not have much exposure to environmentally friendly dentistry. Although dentists across many countries realize that their clinics are many times incomplete with proper disposal equipment, the lack of implementation creates gaps in waste management resulting in bioaccumulation of harmful chemicals.

=== Cost/resource barriers ===
Operational/logistical challenges are a large part of why many offices globally cannot afford to become more environmentally friendly. HVAC and LED lighting systems along with vacuum pumps and amalgam separators require a significant initial investment that many private practices may not have. This large amount of money is needed to maintain these infrastructures that are forgotten about. Many times, clinic owners also prefer to pay for cheaper low-cost plastics rather than pay more for a more environmentally friendly product. In developing countries, there is little to no financial support given to dental offices making it even harder to be conscious of the environment. The financial barriers to implement environmentally friendly equipment are causing clinics to turn towards convenience.

=== Official safety regulations ===
Many limitations towards eco-friendly dentistry stem from safety and infection-control regulations. These laws require dental clinics to rely on single use plastics (SUPs) and other resource-intensive materials. Due to events such as the COVID-19 pandemic, new regulations with PPE create more waste due to an increase use of masks, gowns, covers, and other disposable materials which are not recyclable.

Along with non recyclable trash, biomedical waste is categorized as heterogeneous which requires strict waste management practices. These disposal regulations prohibit practices from choosing more sustainable alternatives, highlighting a gap in waste-management research.

Before considering how to practice green dentistry, clinics must follow regulations on how to design and build dental practices. Building regulations keep ventilation, sterilization-room requirements, lighting standards, and HVAC conditions at a level which is not environmentally sustainable. All of this necessary equipment requires a high-energy system to run, so clinics run into barriers when trying to become more sustainable.
