= Sustainable dentistry =

Sustainable dentistry is when a dental organization voluntarily embeds corporate social responsibility into its organizational culture through the creation of a sustainability policy that outlines its commitment to and strategy for internally and externally focusing all its activities on realizing a triple bottom line, i.e. economic prosperity, social responsibility, and environmental stewardship.

Managing sustainability in dentistry, therefore, is the implementation, monitoring, and adjusting of what this sustainability policy entails within a dental organization. Dental practices can uphold sustainable dentistry by reducing their carbon footprint through various methods such as monitoring product procurement.

== Integration ==
Dental practices can uphold sustainable dentistry by reducing their carbon footprint through various methods such as monitoring product procurement. To reduce the environmental burden created by dentistry, there are a few practices we can do:

- blue bin recycling
- amalgam separator to separate silver amalgam from waste water and prevent mercury from entering the water supply
- dentists contribute 3 to 70% total mercury load entering waste water treatment
- recycle autoclave bags
- replace single use paper with cotton towels
- reusable, glass irrigation syringes instead of disposable ones
- digital radiography instead of traditional to lower silver and lead pollution

Many legislations are calling dentistry to integrate SDGS into daily practices to support a green economy. The FDI has played a significant role in pushing for a legally-binding treaty, Minamata Convention, on mercury by the UNEP.

Instead of advocating for an outright ban, FDI has pushed for measures within the treaty focused on reducing the use of dental amalgam. This means prioritizing dental prevention, investing in research and development of alternative materials, and implementing the best practices for managing amalgam waste. Meanwhile, the UK government has set a goal for all new public sector buildings to be carbon-neutral from 2018 onward, and the NHS aimed for low-carbon healthcare buildings by 2015.

== Barriers ==
Sustainable dentistry also faces a lot of barriers as biomedical waste has only been increasing in dentistry. Dentistry is commonly known as a profession with large electricity demands, water requirements, and harsh environmental effects. This is important because the biggest issue in sustainable dentistry is the amount of waste that is constantly being used. For example, In the United States dentists generate 3.7 tons of mercury waste and 4.8 million lead foils.

The reason none of this has been combated is because sustainable dentistry efforts are low due to scant studies. Implementing measures like enhancing energy efficient, cutting down unnecessary use, adopting low-carbon energy sources can mitigate this impact. One example would be, Green buildings, they integrate design elements that improve energy and resource efficiency by 40-45%.
