= Sound annoyance =

Reaction to noise

Sound annoyance is "a feeling of displeasure associated with any agent or condition [related to sound] that is believed to affect adversely an individual or a group".

== Impact on health and well-being ==
Annoyance implies a negative factor on an individual's well-being and comfort. Its effects may include physiological responses, central nervous system reactions, and biochemical changes.

Physiological reactions to sound annoyance include increased heart rate and increased blood pressure which, among others, may lead to hypertension. Hearing impairment, such as increased hearing threshold, and tinnitus are considered as another possible consequence of sound annoyance.

EEG and magnetoencephalography studies show an increased activity in several parts of the Central Nervous System.

Biochemical changes due to sound annoyance include increased secretion of epinephrine, which is related to the 'fight'-reaction (See fight-or-flight response) and increased adrenal cortical activity (see adrenal cortex), which is related to intense and/or stressful events.

Epidemiological investigations have shown that the negative effects of sound annoyance include "a feeling of resentment, displeasure, dissatisfaction, discomfort or offence when noise interferes with someones thoughts, feelings or actual activities". Besides that, unwanted sounds can mask the positive indicators of safety. These factors may diminish well-being of people that suffer from sound annoyance. Other factors that correlate with sound annoyance are increased absence form work, sleep disturbance, and interference with performing cognitive tasks like paying attention at school.

For a more detailed article about health effects: health effects from noise.

== Measurement ==
Historically, nuisance sound has been measured using A-weighted sound pressure level metrics such as the maximum sound pressure level with one-second time integration, day-night average sound level (a 24-hour average of daytime and weighted nighttime sound level), or other long term time-averages. Measurement is made using a sound level meter with appropriate statistical averaging and corrections to predict the level of sound presented to a human listener. Psychoacoustic analysis reveals that sound pressure level is a less than ideal predictor of human reception of noise, so efforts have been made since the 1960s to apply loudness metrics instead, which can incorporate other factors such as spectral and temporal auditory masking and level-dependent frequency weighting to more accurately track human reception. Integration of individual sounds into an auditory or dose estimate has traditionally followed an extension of Stevens's power law which applies simple power or energy summation such that a sound lasting twice as long is considered of equal impact as one 3 dB higher in amplitude. More recent work such as Moore and Glasberg on time-varying loudness and Nordtest NT ACOU 112 has examined a more detailed understanding of other factors such as onset rate and masking.

== European guidelines ==
The European Union (EU) set up European guidelines in respect to noise pollution. For nighttime, it is advised to not exceed the 40 dB L_{night} threshold outside the residence. An interim threshold of 55 dB L_{night} is set as an upper bound, because above this limit, (sleeping) disorders are more prevalent. However, about 20% of people living in or near urban areas suffer from sounds at night that exceed even the interim threshold.

== Law in the Netherlands ==
Sound annoyance is a subjective matter and cannot be covered by law. In the Netherlands the government set up laws to protect households and other noise-sensitive buildings like hospitals and schools from noise pollution. There are different laws for different sound sources; airplanes, traffic, industry and neighbours.

Traffic and industry are clustered together and are subdivided into four categories; road traffic inside urban areas, outside urban areas, railway traffic and industrial noise. All four of these categories have a ‘preferred limit’ and a ‘specified limit’. The preferred limit, the ‘lower bound’, is not to be exceeded in the planned noise of a new highway, railway or industry. When this system exceeds the lower bound nonetheless, a municipal exemption can be given when appealed to the interim "urban and environmental approach". The specified limit, also called the ‘upper bound’ can only be exceeded exceptionally. The municipal exemption is insufficient in this case.

The laws for aviation induced noise at the main airport of the Netherlands, Schiphol, state that the volume of sounds produced by airplanes may not be higher than 63,46 dB(A) and at different (mostly residential) areas around Schiphol there are specific limits for the noise levels that are allowed. An overview of the locations and their noise limits can be found here:. The sound limits of these locations are reevaluated every year.

For sound annoyance induced by neighbors there is no law. However, the government offers neighborhood mediation by an independent mediator.
