= Medications used in dentistry and periodontics =

In periodontics, medications may be used for four main purposes. These purposes include the management of infection, swelling, pain, and sedation. Although some patients may experience pain, swelling, and infection as a result of an acute periodontal problem such as advanced periodontal disease, periodontic patients usually do not need medication until they are faced with surgery. For successful surgery, medication is then introduced prior to the operation, usually the morning before the procedure and is continued for up to two weeks after.

== Conscious sedation in dentistry ==
During the surgery, dentists use medication to not only ease the pain of the procedure, but also to reduce patient anxiety. With conscious sedation, you remain comfortable and pain-free. The term "medication dentistry" is also referred to as anxiety-free dentistry, relaxation dentistry or comfortable dentistry. This is because most of the patients have feelings of anxiety during even a routine trip to the dentist's office.

There are a number of sedation drugs, which can be taken by mouth. They have been developed specifically for the purpose of conscious sedation in dentistry. Sleep dentistry is a common term once used to describe a visit to the dentist. The interesting thing is that though it was referred to as sleep dentistry, the patient never actually went to sleep during the visit. Sleep dentistry should really be applied to dentistry which uses the aid of general anesthesia. The dentist will determine which medication is best used during sedation.

=== Diazepam ===
This is probably the most well recognized drug used today. Diazepam (Valium) has been used since the 1960s. It is a well-known sedative. It is extremely useful during appointments where the most extensive dentistry is being performed.

=== Triazolam ===
Triazolam (Halcion) is the most well-known treatment for insomnia. It is a highly effective drug, which can be used in conjunction with an antihistamine. It is similar to diazepam and is a popular choice for many different dentists. Triazolam is typically used for shorter appointments.

=== Zaleplon ===
Zaleplon (Sonata) is also used in the treatment of insomnia. The patient is not in an extended sleep during throughout oral sedation, but is rather relaxed and comfortable throughout the procedure.

=== Lorazepam ===
Lorazepam (Ativan) is a very commonly prescribed drug for anxiety. It is very useful in appointments that are longer than two hours.

=== Hydroxyzine ===
Hydroxyzine (Vistaril) is classified as an antihistamine. It has anti-anxiety effects and works in conjunction with many benzodiazepines. It has no amnesic properties.

=== Midazolam ===
Midazolam the shortest half-life of any available drugs. It is ideal for short appointments and simple procedures. It has many anti-anxiety properties as well as amnesic properties.

== General medication information ==
Medications are typically used to control pain and anxiety in dentistry. The patient is very rarely out completely during a dental procedure, even if he or she cannot accurately remember the procedure upon waking up.

== Anti-inflammatory ==
Anti-inflammatory medications are used to relieve discomfort and redness of the mouth and gums. They are available by prescription only and are available as pastes under some brand names such as Kenalog and Orabase. There are also non-prescription anti-inflammatory medications, such as Motrin, which may be used to relieve pain and are available over-the-counter.

== Anesthesia ==
Local anesthesia, general anesthesia, nitrous oxide and intravenous sedation are all used during common procedures to help dull and control pain and anxiety.

Topical anesthetic agents are typically intraorally to control pain or irritation caused by toothache, teething, or sores in or around the mouth. Topical anesthetics are available by prescription or over-the-counter. They are available in sprays, dental paste, dental gels, lozenges, ointments and solutions. Anbesol, Chloraseptic, Orajel and Xylocaine are examples of available anesthetics over-the-counter. Some medications are also given in order to control plaque and gingivitis. This type of medication is typically available in a mouthwash.

== Antiseptics ==
Antiseptics may be recommended (over-the-counter) by the dentist to help reduce plaque and gingivitis buildup, as well as kill germs, which may be the cause of bad breath.

Knowing the role of supragingival plaque in the initiation of periodontal disease and insufficient control of the plate, the use of antiseptics is warranted. These anti-plaque derived from different chemical classes and have different mechanisms of action.

== Other medications ==
There are also many medications, which are used to treat tooth decay. Fluoride is used to prevent tooth decay in individuals. Fluoride is available in non-prescription form and is available in many different types of toothpaste.

Muscle relaxants and antifungal medication is also sometimes prescribed within dentistry. Muscle relaxants may be prescribed in order to reduce the patient's stress levels and/or to help the patient discontinue grinding their teeth. It can also be used to treat TMJ disorders.

Antifungal medication may be used to treat oral thrush, which is common in infants. The goal of treatment is stop the spreading of the Candida fungal infection.
