= Dentistry in the United States =

Percent of adults 65+ who have had all teeth extracted.

The practice of dentistry in the United States is overseen by several agencies, including the American Dental Association, the Commission on Dental Accreditation, and the regional boards. Ultimate licensure is the responsibility of individual states. There are roughly 190,000 practicing dentists in the United States.

== Dental education ==
In order to be accepted to an American dental school, most candidates must possess at least a bachelor's degree, which requires the successful completion of all appropriate pre-requisite courses.

The first 2 years of dental school consist mostly of didactic education, in addition to simulation courses. The last two years generally involve direct patient care under supervision. There tends to be much overlap in most schools' curricula; the didactic years may have some clinical components, while the last two years still have significant didactic coursework.

During dental school, students must take and successfully pass Part I and Part II of the National Board Dental Examination (also known as "the Boards"), which are administered by the ADA. Part I is usually taken after the second year of dental school, while Part II is usually taken sometime in the fourth year.

The cost of attending a dental school is high; most newly graduated dentists have borrowed US$200,000 or more in student loans and other debts to pay for their education.

== Licensure ==
=== Accredited programs ===
The first step in practicing dentistry in the United States is graduating from an accredited dental degree program in the United States and Canada. The graduates of Australian dental schools cannot be licensed in the United States. The reciprocity agreement between CDAC (Canada) and Australia does not extend to the United States and its Commission on Dental Accreditation (CODA). The reciprocity agreement that CODA has with CDAC only covers Canadian programs. CODA does have policies and procedures in place for accrediting established international predoctoral education programs.

=== Regional boards ===
Most states require candidates to pass a regional board exam. Regional boards are agencies which are contracted to test graduating dental students on clinical skills for a specific region of the country. These exams usually have several components, both written and clinical, and the latter is performed on live patients. The different boards include the Northeast Regional Board of Dental Examiners (usually referred to as the "NERB"), the Western Regional Examining Board (usually referred to as the "WREB"), the Central Regional Dental Testing Service (CRDTS), and the Southern Regional Testing Agency (SRTA). California, Colorado, Connecticut, and Minnesota are states which allow candidates to complete a 1-year General Practice Residency (GPR), or an Advanced Education in General Dentistry (AEGD) in lieu of a regional board exam. As of 2007, New York no longer accepted the NERB, and has since required all graduates to complete a GPR or AEGD.

== Specialty training ==
Dental graduates have the option of pursuing specialty training. Currently, the American Dental Association formally recognizes 12 specialties:

- Dental anesthesiology
- Dental public health
- Endodontics
- Pediatric dentistry
- Periodontics
- Prosthodontics
- Oral and maxillofacial pathology
- Oral and maxillofacial radiology
- Oral and maxillofacial surgery
- Oral medicine
- Orofacial pain
- Orthodontics

== Dental economics ==
Until the late 20th century, most of dentistry was paid directly by patients. Today, funding for dentistry includes: self-payment, private insurance, employer-sponsored insurance, Medicaid, and SCHIP.

The median annual earnings of salaried dentists in the United States was $136,960 in May 2006, indicating a high degree of scarcity for qualified personnel. The opinions and thoughts of dentists, much like those of other professionals, are sought after by their organizations and clients. The dentist creates a diagnosis, consults the patient, and conceptualizes a treatment. In 2009, Dental assistants made roughly $14.40 an hour, about $32,000 annually. Unlike dentists, dental assistants do not have much influence over the treatment of patients. They carry out routine procedures and follow the dentists' instructions.

== Criticisms ==
Since 1977, evidence has shown that seeing a dentist every six months, as is standard in the United States, is not associated with improved dental or oral health.

Some of the largest dentistry companies in the United States have been subject to class-action lawsuits for their fraudulent practices.

== See also ==
- Dentistry in rural Alaska
- Dentistry in Canada
