= Dental degree =

Academic degree

A number of professional degrees in dentistry are offered by dental schools in various countries around the world.

== Degrees ==
Dental degrees may include:

=== Bachelor's degree ===
- Bachelor of Dental Surgery (BDS)
- Bachelor of Dentistry (BDent)
- Bachelor of Dental Science (BDSc)
- Bachelor of Science in Dentistry (BScD)
- Bachelor of Medicine in Dental Medicine (BM)
- Baccalaureus Dentalis Chirurgiae (BChD)

=== Master's degree ===
- Master of Science (MS or MSc)
- Master of Science in Dentistry (MSD or MScD)
- Master of Medical Science (MMSc)
- Master of Dentistry (MDent)
- Master of Dental Surgery (MDS)
- Master of Dental Science (MDentSci)
- Master of Stomatology (MS)
- Master of Clinical Stomatology (MCS)
- Master of Stomatological Medicine (MSM)

=== Doctorate ===
- Doctor of Dental Surgery (DDS)
- Doctor of Dental Medicine/Doctor of Medicine in Dentistry (DMD)
- Doctor of Clinical Dentistry (DClinDent)
- Doctor of Dental Science (DDSc)
- Doctor of Science in Dentistry (DScD)
- Doctor of Medical Science (DMSc)
- Doctor of Dentistry (DDent)
- Doctor of Philosophy in Dentistry (PhD)

== Certificates and fellowships ==
=== Certificates ===
In some universities, especially in the United States, some postgraduate programs award certificates only.

- Diploma in Dentistry (SMF)
- Certificate, GPR/AEGD/Orofacial Pain
- Certificate, Anesthesiology/Oral & Maxillofacial Pathology/Endodontics/Prosthodontics/Periodontics/Orthodontics/Dental Public Health/Pediatric Dentistry/OMS (American Dental Association – recognized specialty programs)
- Certificate, DMTD

=== Commonwealth post-nominals ===
In commonwealth countries, the Royal Colleges of Dentistry (or Faculty of Dentistry of the college) awards post-nominals upon completion of a series of examinations.

- Fellow of the Medical College in Dental Surgery (FMCDS), the National Postgraduate Medical College of Nigeria (NPMCN)
- Fellow of the West African College of Surgeons (FWACS), the West African College of Surgeons
- Fellow of Dental Surgery of the Royal College of Surgeons (FDSRCS)
- Membership in the Faculty of Dental Surgery of the Royal College of Physicians and Surgeons of Glasgow [MFDS RCPS (Glasg)]
- Membership in the Faculty of Dental Surgery of the Royal College Surgeons (MFDS RCS)
- Fellow of Royal Australasian College of Dental Surgeons (FRACDS)
- Membership in the Royal Australasian College of Dental Surgeons (MRACDS)
- Membership in Orthodontics, Royal College of Surgeons (MOrth RCS)
- Fellow of the Royal College of Dentists of Canada (FRCD(C))
- Member of Royal College of Dentists of Canada (MRCD(C))
- Fellow of the College of Dental Surgeons of Hong Kong (FCDSHK)
- Member of the College of Dental Surgeons of Hong Kong (MCDSHK)
- Fellow College of Physician and Surgeons, Bangladesh (FCPS)
- Fellow College of Physician and Surgeons, Pakistan (FCPS)
- License of Dental Surgery, Royal College of Surgeons (L.D.S. (Eng.))
- Fellowship in Sports Dentistry/Fellow Sports Dentistry (FSD)

In the U.S., most dental specialists attain Board Certification (Diplomate Status) by completing a series of written and oral examinations with the appropriate Boards. e.g. Diplomate, American Board of Periodontics.

Each fully qualifies the holder to practice dentistry in at least the jurisdiction in which the degree was presented, assuming local and federal government licensure requirements are met.

== Countries and regions ==
=== Oceania ===
==== Australia ====
Australia has nine dental schools:

- University of Sydney, NSW
- Charles Sturt University, NSW*
- Griffith University, QLD*
- University of Queensland, QLD
- James Cook University, QLD*
- University of Adelaide, SA
- La Trobe University, VIC*
- University of Melbourne, VIC
- University of Western Australia, WA

(*) indicates new university dental programs that have opened up to aim at increasing the number of rural dental students entering and to return to rural practice. Traditional "sandstone" universities have been Sydney, Melbourne, Queensland, Adelaide and Western Australia.

Sydney (as of 2001), Melbourne (as of 2010) and Western Australia (as of 2013) have switched to 4-year graduate program that require a previous bachelor's degree for admission.

Postgraduate training is available in all dental specialties. Degrees awarded used to be Master of Dental Surgery/Science (MDS/MDSc), but lately have changed to Doctorate in Clinical Dentistry (DClinDent).

==== New Zealand ====
New Zealand has only one dental school:

- Faculty of Dentistry, University of Otago, Dunedin

The Faculty of Dentistry awards Bachelor of Dental Surgery (BDS) and Master of Community Dentistry (MComDent) for public health & community dentistry, and Doctorate in Clinical Dentistry (DClinDent) for the other dental specialties.

The body responsible for registering dental practitioners is the Dental Council of New Zealand (DCNZ).

==== Trans Tasman mutual recognition ====
Both Australia and New Zealand recognize the educational and professional qualifications and grant professional licenses via reciprocity identical to the United States and Canada.

==== General Dental Council of the UK ====
The United Kingdom General Dental Council had been recognizing the Australian and New Zealand dental qualification as registrable degree until 2000. Graduates who have applied for dental license registration in the United Kingdom now have to sit the Overseas Registration Exam (ORE), a three-part examination.

==== Canadian registration ====
Australia and Canada have a reciprocal accreditation agreement, which allows graduates of Canadian or Australian dental schools to register in either country. However, this only applies to the graduates of 2011 class and does not apply to the previous years' graduates.

==== Royal Australasian College of Dental Surgeons ====
Royal Australasian College of Dental Surgeons (RACDS) is a postgraduate body that focuses on postgraduate training of general practitioners and specialist dentists. Additional postgraduate qualifications can be obtained through the college after the candidate has completed the Primary Examination (basic science examination in anatomy, histology, physiology, biochemistry, pathology and microbiology) and the Final Examination (clinical subjects in dentistry). After the successful completion of the examinations and meeting the college requirements, the candidate is awarded the title of Fellow of Royal Australasian College of Dental Surgeons (FRACDS). For the dental specialists, the exam pathway is similar (Primary Examinations) and then clinical/oral examinations just prior to completing the specialist training leads to the award of the title Member of Royal Australasian College of Dental Surgeons in Special Field Stream (MRACDS (SFS)). For the busy GP dentists, MRACDS in general stream is also available.

=== Bangladesh ===
The graduation in Dentistry is named here as Bachelor of Dental Surgery (BDS) also have diploma in Dentistry. At present there are three universities that have medical faculty that offer dental degrees: The University of Dhaka, the University of Chittagong, the University of Rajshahi, and diplomas also by the state medical faculty. These public universities have dental colleges and hospitals that may be publicly or privately funded, that offer education for the degree.

At present, postgraduate degrees in specialized dentistry exist in main four clinical specialities:

- Orthodontics and Dentofacial Orthopedics
- Oral and Maxillofacial Surgery
- Conservative Dentistry and Endodontics
- Prosthodontics

=== Canada ===
There are ten approved dental schools in Canada:

- University of Toronto (1868) [D.D.S.]
- McGill University (1905) [D.M.D.]
- Université de Montréal (1905) [D.M.D.]
- Dalhousie University (1908) [D.D.S.]
- University of Alberta (1923) [D.D.S.]
- University of Manitoba (1958) [D.M.D.]
- University of British Columbia (1964) [D.M.D.]
- University of Western Ontario (1966) [D.D.S.]
- University of Saskatchewan (1968) [D.M.D.]
- Université Laval (1971) [D.M.D.]

Several universities in Canada offer the DDS degree, including the University of Toronto, the University of Western Ontario, the University of Alberta, and Dalhousie University, while the remaining Canadian dental schools offer the Doctor of Dental Medicine degree to their graduates.

Additional qualifications can be obtained through the Royal College of Dentists of Canada (RCDC), which administers examinations for qualified dental specialists as part of the dentistry profession in Canada. The current examinations are known as the National Dental Specialty Examination (NDSE). Successful completion may lead to Fellowship in the college (FRCD(C)) and may be used for provincial registration purposes.

Canada has a reciprocal accreditation agreement with Australia, Ireland, and the United States, which recognize the dental training of graduates of Canadian dental schools. Obtaining licensure to work in any of the three other countries often requires additional steps, such as successfully completing national board examinations and fulfilling requirements of local governing bodies.

=== China ===
China has many universities teaching dental degrees both at undergraduate and postgraduate level. Chinese universities have adapted the programmes of American and European degrees. The undergraduate degree is Bachelor of Medicine with a major in stomatology or dental surgery, and the postgraduate degree is Master of Medicine in stomatology (口腔医学硕士). Recently, China has a new name for its master's degree as Master of Stomatological Medicine (MSM). The MSM has been offered by top class Chinese universities. This program includes a comprehensive syllabus to produce graduates with extensive knowledge in respective specialties, skills in clinical practice, and research potential. The other branches of dentistry remain the same as American universities.

=== Finland ===
In Finland, education in dentistry is through a 5.5-year Licenciate of Dental Medicine (DMD or DDS) course, which is offered after high school graduation. Application is by a national combined dental and medical school entry examination. As of 2011, dentistry is provided by Faculties of Medicine in four universities:

- University of Helsinki
- University of Turku
- University of Oulu
- University of Eastern Finland, Kuopio Campus

The first phase of training begins with a unified two-year preclinical training for dentists and physicians. Problem-based learning (PBL) is employed depending on university. The third year-autumn consists of clinico, theoretical phase in pathology, genetics, radiology and public health, and is partially combined with physicians' second phase. Third-phase clinical training lasts for the remaining three years and includes periods of being on call at University Central Hospital Trauma Centre, Clinic of Oral and Maxillofacial Diseases, and the Children's clinic. Candidates who successfully complete the fourth year of training qualify for a paid summer rotation in a Community health center of their choice. Annual intake of dentists into Faculties of Medicine is a national total 160 students.

Doctor of Philosophy (PhD) research is strongly encouraged alongside postgraduate training, which is available in all four universities and lasts an additional 3–6 years. Starting in 2014, the University of Helsinki introduced a new doctoral training system. In this new system, all doctoral candidates belong to a doctoral programme within a doctoral school. FINDOS Helsinki – Doctoral Programme in Oral Sciences – is a programme in the Doctoral School in Health Sciences.

The 11 postgraduate programs are:

- Clinical dentistry:
  - Periodontology
  - Pedodontology and Preventive Dentistry
  - Cariology and Endodontology
  - Prosthodontology and Stomatognathic Physiology
- Diagnostic dentistry:
  - Oral and Maxillofacial Pathology
  - Oral and Maxillofacial Radiology
  - Oral and Maxillofacial Medicine
  - Oral Clinical Microbiology (starts in 2014)
- Other:
  - Orthodontics
  - Oral and Maxillofacial Surgery
  - Oral Public Health

=== India ===
In India, training in dentistry is through a five-year Bachelor of Dental Surgery (BDS) course, which includes four years of study followed by one year of internship. As of 2019, 310 colleges (40 run by the government and 292 in the private sector) were offering dental education. This amounts to an annual intake of 33,500 graduates.

The three-year, full-time postgraduate Master of Dental Surgery (MDS) is the highest degree in dentistry awarded in India, and its holders are bestowed as consultants in one of these specialties:

- Prosthodontics (fixed, removable, maxillofacial, and implant prosthodontics)
- Periodontics
- Oral and maxillofacial surgery
- Conservative dentistry and endodontics
- Orthodontics and dentofacial orthopaedics
- Oral pathology and microbiology
- Community dentistry
- Pedodontics and preventive dentistry
- Oral medicine diagnosis and radiology
- Master in Public Health Dentistry

=== Israel ===
Israel has two dental schools, the Hebrew University-Hadassah School of Dental Medicine in Jerusalem, founded by the Alpha Omega fraternity and the Tel Aviv University School of Dental Medicine in Tel Aviv. The two schools have six-year program and grant the Doctor of Dental Medicine (DMD) degrees. In recent decades, students are eligible for the Bachelor of Medical Sciences (BMedSc) degree after the first three years of training.

=== Nigeria ===
Many universities award BDS and a few BChD (Baccalaureus Chirurgiae Dental) degrees. In Nigeria, training in dentistry is through a six-year course, typically, three years of preclinical training followed by three years of clinical training after passing part I exams comprising anatomy, biochemistry, and physiology. This is followed by one year of internship or housemanship, after which graduates can go into clinical practice as general dentists. Some go on to specialty training by completing a residency program, to become hospital consultants.

As of 2022, 11 dental schools, were active, including two with partial accreditations. Fully accredited programs are at the University of Lagos, University of Ibadan, University of Benin, University of Port-Harcourt, University of Nigeria (Enugu), University of Maiduguri, Bayero University (Kano), Lagos State University, and Obafemi Awolowo University (Ile-Ife).

=== South Africa ===
Related: Medical education in South Africa.

Training in South Africa generally comprises the five-year Bachelor of Dental Surgery, followed by one year's compulsory medical service/internship. The country has five universities with dental faculties:

Institution	School	Founded	Location	Programme(s)
University of KwaZulu-Natal			Durban	Diploma in Dental Therapy
University of Limpopo			MEDUNSA Campus, Pretoria	BDS, MDent, MDS (Master of Dental Science), PhD
University of Pretoria	School of Dentistry		Pretoria	BChD, MChD, MSc Dentistry, PhD(Dentistry), DSc
University of the Western Cape	Faculty of Dentistry		Cape Town	BChD, MChD, MSc(Dent), PhD, DSc(Odont)
University of the Witwatersrand			Johannesburg	BDS, MDent, MSc(Dent), PhD(Dent), DSc

Until 2003, Stellenbosch University offered the BChD degree. In 2004, the dental faculties of the University of the Western Cape and Stellenbosch University merged and moved to the University of the Western Cape, which is currently the largest dental school in Africa.

Specialisation is through one of the universities as a Master of Dentistry, or through the College of Dentistry within the Colleges of Medicine of South Africa, with certifications offered in oral medicine and periodontics, orthodontics, and prosthodontics. Research degrees are the MSc(Dent) / MDS and PhD(Dent).

=== Ireland and United Kingdom ===
Many universities award BDS degrees, including the University of Sheffield, the University of Bristol, Barts and the London School of Medicine and Dentistry, the University of Birmingham, the University of Liverpool, the University of Manchester, the University of Glasgow, the University of Dundee, the University of Aberdeen, King's College London, Cardiff University, Newcastle University, Queen's University Belfast, the University of Central Lancashire, and Peninsula College of Medicine and Dentistry.

In the Republic of Ireland, the University College Cork awards BDS degrees and Trinity College Dublin awards BDentSc degrees.

The University of Leeds awards BChD and MChD (Bachelor/Master of Dental Surgery) degrees.

The Royal College of Surgeons of England, Edinburgh, Glasgow, and Ireland award LDS (Licence/Licentiate in Dental Surgery) degrees.

=== United States ===
In the United States, at least three years of undergraduate education are required to be admitted to a dental school; however, most dental schools require at least a bachelor's degree. No particular course of study is required as an undergraduate other than completing the requisite "predental" courses, which generally includes one year of general biology, chemistry, organic chemistry, physics, English, and higher-level mathematics such as statistics and calculus. Some dental schools have requirements that go beyond the basic requirements such as psychology, sociology, biochemistry, anatomy, physiology, etc. The majority of predental students major in a science, but this is not required as some students elect to major in a nonscience-related field.

In addition to core prerequisites, the Dental Admission Test, a multiple-choice standardized examination, is also required for potential dental students. The DAT is usually taken during the spring semester of one's junior year. The vast majority of dental schools require an interview before admissions can be granted. The interview is designed to evaluate the motivation, character, and personality of the applicant.

For the 2009–2010 application cycle, 11,632 applicants applied for admission to dental schools in the United States. Just 4,067 were eventually accepted. The average dental school applicant entering the school year in 2009 had an overall GPA of 3.54 and a science GPA of 3.46. Additionally, their mean DAT Academic Average (AA) was 19.00, while their DAT Perceptual Ability Test (PAT) score was 19.40.

==== Dental education and training ====
Dental school is four academic years in duration and is similar in format to medical school: two years of basic medical and dental sciences, followed by two years of clinical training (with continued didactic coursework). Before graduating, every dental student must successfully complete the National Board Dental Examination Part I and II (commonly referred to as NBDE I & II). The NBDE Part I is usually taken at the end of the second year after the majority of the didactic courses have been completed. The NBDE Part I covers gross anatomy, biochemistry, physiology, microbiology, pathology, and dental anatomy and occlusion. The NBDE Part II is usually taken during winter of the last year of dental school and consists of operative dentistry, pharmacology, endodontics, periodontics, oral surgery, pain control, prosthodontics, orthodontics, pedodontics, oral pathology, and radiology. NBDE Part I scores are Pass/Fail since 2012.

Since the COVID-19 pandemic, nearly all jurisdictions now utilize the INBDE system.

After graduating, the vast majority of new dentists go directly into practice, while others enter a residency program. Some residency programs train dentists in advanced general dentistry such as General Practice Residencies and Advanced Education in General Dentistry Residencies, commonly referred to as GPR and AEGD. Most GPR and AEGD programs are one year in duration, but several are two years long or provide an optional second year. GPR programs are usually affiliated with a hospital and thus require the dentist to treat a wide variety of patients including trauma, critically ill, and medically compromised patients. Additionally, GPR programs require residents to rotate through various departments within the hospital, such as anesthesia, internal medicine, and emergency medicine, to name a few. AEGD programs are usually in a dental-school setting where the focus is treating complex cases in a comprehensive manner.

==== DDS vs DMD degree ====
In the United States, the Doctor of Dental Surgery and Doctor of Dental Medicine are terminal professional doctorates, which qualify a professional for licensure. The DDS and DMD degrees are considered equivalent. The American Dental Association specifies:

The DDS (Doctor of Dental Surgery) and DMD (Doctor of Dental Medicine) are the same degrees. They are awarded upon graduation from dental school to become a General Dentist. The majority of dental schools award the DDS degree; however, some award a DMD degree. The education and degrees are, in substance, the same.

Harvard University was the first dental school to award the DMD degree. Harvard only grants degrees in Latin, and the Latin translation of Doctor of Dental Surgery, "Chirurgiae Dentium Doctoris", did not share the "DDS" initials of the English term. "The degree 'Scientiae Dentium Doctoris', which would leave the initials of DDS unchanged, was then considered, but was rejected on the ground that dentistry was not a science." (The word order in Latin is not fixed, only the inflections; "Scientiae Dentium Doctoris" = "Doctoris Dentium Scientiae".) A Latin scholar was consulted. It was finally decided that "Medicinae Doctoris" be modified with "Dentariae". This is how the DMD, or "Doctor Medicinae Dentariae" degree, was started. (The genitive inflection -is on "Doctoris" instead of the nominative "Doctor" simply reflects that the syntax on the diploma was "the degree of Doctor of Dental Medicine"; they are both correct.) The assertion that "dentistry was not a science" reflected the view that dental surgery was an art informed by science, not a science per se—notwithstanding that the scientific component of dentistry is today recognized in the Doctor of Dental Science (DDSc) degree.

Other dental schools made the switch to this notation, and in 1989, 23 of the 66 North American dental schools awarded the DMD. No meaningful difference exists between the DMD and DDS degrees, and all dentists must meet the same national and regional certification standards to practice.

Some other prominent dental schools that award the DMD degree are the University of Florida, Midwestern University-IL, Midwestern University-AZ, Medical University of South Carolina, Augusta University (formerly Medical College of Georgia), University of Connecticut, University of Alabama at Birmingham, University of Louisville, University of Puerto Rico, Rutgers University, Tufts University, Oregon Health and Sciences University, University of Pennsylvania, Case Western Reserve University, University of Illinois at Chicago, Boston University, Temple University, Western University of Health Sciences, University of Pittsburgh, University of Nevada, Las Vegas, and East Carolina University.

The United States Department of Education and the National Science Foundation do not include the DDS and DMD among the degrees that are equivalent to research doctorates.

==== Licensing examinations ====
To practice, a dentist must pass a licensing examination administered by an individual state or more commonly a region. A handful of states maintain independent dental licensing examinations, while the majority accept a regional board examination. The Northeast Regional Board (NERB), Western Regional Board (WREB), Central Regional Dental Testing Service (CRDTS), and Southern Regional Testing Agency (SRTA), Council of Interstate Testing Agencies (CITA) are the five regional testing agencies that administer licensing examinations. Once the examination is passed, the dentist may then apply to individual states that accept the regional board test passed. Each state requires prospective practitioners to pass an ethics/jurisprudence examination, as well, before a license is granted. To maintain one's dental license, the doctor must complete Continuing Dental Education (CDE) courses periodically (usually annually). This promotes the continued exploration of knowledge. The amount of CE required varies from state to state, but is generally 10-25 CE hours a year.

The completion of a dental degree can be followed by either an entrance into private practice, further postgraduate study and training, or research and academics.

==== Dental specialties in the United States ====
Twelve dental specialties are recognized in the United States. Becoming a specialist requires one to train in a residency or advanced graduate training program. Once residency is completed, the doctor is granted a certificate of specialty training. Many specialty programs have optional or required advanced degrees such as a master's degree: (MS, MSc, MDS, MSD, MDSc, MMSc, MPhil, or MDent), doctoral degree: (DClinDent, DChDent, DMSc, PhD), or medical degree: (MD/MBBS specific to maxillofacial surgery).

- Anesthesiology: 3–4 years
- Orthodontics: 2–3 years
- Endodontics: 2–3 years
- Oral and maxillofacial surgery: 4–6 years (additional time for MD/MBBS degree granting programs)
- Periodontics: 3 years
- Prosthodontics: 2–3 years
  - Maxillofacial prosthodontics 1 year (a prosthodontist may elect to sub-specialize in maxillofacial prosthodontics)
- Oral and maxillofacial radiology: 3 years
- Oral and maxillofacial pathology: 3–5 years
- Oral medicine: 2–4 years
- Orofacial pain: 1–3 years
- Pediatric dentistry: 2–3 years
- Dental public health: 3 years

The following are currently recognized as dental specialties in the US under the American Board of Dental Specialties (ABDS):

- Oral medicine: 2–4 years
- Orofacial pain: 1–3 years
- Oral implantology/Implant dentistry: seven or more years of experience in the practice of implant dentistry and have completed at least 75 implant cases. Applicants must successfully complete both the Part I and Part II examination within four year.
- Dental Board of Anesthesiology: 3–4 years

The following are not currently recognized as dental specialties in the US.

- Special needs dentistry: 3 years
- Geriatric dentistry: ranges from a weekend course to a 2-year masters course depending on the certificate issuing agency.
- Cosmetic dentistry: ranges from a weekend course to a 1-year course depending on the certificate issuing agency.

Dentists who have completed accredited specialty training programs in these fields are designated registrable (U.S. "Board Eligible") and warrant exclusive titles such as anesthesiologist, orthodontist, oral and maxillofacial surgeon, endodontist, pedodontist, periodontist, or prosthodontist upon satisfying certain local (U.S. "Board Certified"), (Australia/NZ: "FRACDS"), or (Canada: "FRCD(C)") registry requirements.

== See also ==
- American Student Dental Association
- List of dental schools in the United States
