= Dentistry in rural Alaska =

The practice of dental care in rural Alaska is overseen by the American Dental Association and other organizations under the jurisdiction of dentistry in the United States, with major differences from dentistry in the contiguous states. The oral health situation among the Alaskan Native population is among the most severe globally, with notably high rates of oral disease. Children in this population aged 2 to 5 years have almost five times the amount of tooth decay as children of the same age elsewhere in the United States, and adults have 2.5 times the amount of tooth decay as adults elsewhere. Other factors impacting the population's dental health include the difficulty of obtaining fresh food in remote locations, lack of fluoridated running water, and reduced access to education on the importance of dental health.

The United States federal government and the Alaska Native Corporations have funded multiple programs in the state to target healthcare discrepancies arising from various factors: distance, affecting accessibility and practitioner retention; environmental or general racism; fear; and lack of access to affordable, quality housing and food. The cost of transportation worsens many of these factors; in 2011, an estimated 85,000 Alaska Natives lived in rural villages accessible only by boat or bush plane. Due to low retention of qualified dentists from external regions, dental therapy programs have taken root in the state to create career opportunities and increase healthcare access. These programs have served as models for other states to create similar programs.

== History ==
=== Early healthcare acts ===
The Snyder Act of 1921 was the first Act of Congress to appropriate funds for the health of the Indian population. Next came the Indian Health Care Improvement Act of 1976, signed on October 1 by President Gerald R. Ford. This Act recognized the need for better health care among the Indian population, as their general health registered far below that of the general population of the United States The Improvement Act also appropriated funds for the facilities used for Indian and Alaska Native health care as most of these facilities were far below the quality obtained by non-Indian health care facilities.

After the Indian Self-Determination and Education Assistance Act of 1975, Alaska Native Tribes and Regional Native corporations contracted with federal agencies to fund health programs and to allow these entities to deliver health, medical, and educational services to the American Indian and Alaska Native People. In 1997, the United States government required Alaska Native groups to combine their healthcare efforts, creating the Alaska Native Tribal Health Consortium to manage the distribution of Indian Health Services money and allow the Alaskan Native community to self-govern their own funds.

=== Dental Health Aide Therapists Program ===
Modeled after a program in New Zealand, the Dental Health Aide Therapists (DHAT) Program began in 2004 and created a system for rural healthcare that multiple states would later follow. Early sponsors included: The W.K. Kellogg Foundation (who then funded similar programs in Kansas, New Mexico, Ohio, Vermont and Washington), various Alaska Native regional health organizations who paid tuition for the program's students, and the United States Government. In particular, the Indian Health Care Improvement Act of 2007 earmarked funds to continue the Dental Aide program. Though not a traditional dentist, a dental therapist can work independently of a licensed dentist's supervision. A certified dental therapist in Alaska receives two years of intensive training in a program specific to Alaskan dentistry. Graduates may perform basic dental work - this includes drilling, administering fillings, and extraction. More complicated procedures (such as root canals and more complex extractions) must be referred to a fully-trained dentist. Once Dental Health Aides complete their program, they are permitted, under a Federal Agreement, to directly bill Medicaid for services provided.

The program generated controversy but soon spread to other states. In 2008, the Alaska Dental Association opposed the program, claiming that dental therapists offer sub-standard care and have the capability to cause more harm than good, and the American Dental Association opposed dental therapists practicing without the supervision of a licensed dentist in the lower 49 states. However, in 2009, the Minnesota Legislature approved the nation's first non-tribal dental therapy program, and Maine and Vermont followed suit in 2014 and 2016, respectively. More states enacted tribal programs – Oregon in 2016, Washington in 2017, and Idaho in 2019. In 2018, Arizona and Michigan passed their own laws, and New Mexico, Connecticut, and Nevada joined in 2019; Florida, Kansas, Massachusetts, North Dakota, and Wisconsin have their own programs.

=== Dental therapy program results ===
Scientists from RTI International and the University of North Carolina performed a study in June 2011 to evaluate Alaska's DHAT initiative on behalf of the Alaska Native Tribal Health Consortium. The study found that "Alaska's dental therapists are now providing safe, competent and appropriate care in their scope of practice." According to the study, the DHAT program provided broader access to care and contributed to the local economy, whereas the itinerant dental care system had been failing for fifty years. One dental health medical hub found that though they struggled to retain fully licensed dentists even with incentives like student loan repayments, DHAT tended to stay in their communities, increasing continuous access to care. The Dental Health Aide Program is viewed as vital by delegates who are attempting to keep dental care in the villages of Alaska. In summary, they found that dental therapists are technically competent to do their jobs effectively and safely, that their mission to successfully treat cavities and help relieve pain for people who have extremely limited access to health care has been successful, that patient satisfaction was very high, and that they are a well-accepted institution in tribal villages.

By 2017, the dental therapist program had been found successful in providing safe, competent care for rural Alaskans. According to data from the Yukon Kuskokwim Health Corporation (YKHC) collected from 2009 to 2014, emergency care fell from 38% of dental services provided to 24%, and preventive services increased from 28% to over 40%. In 2013, the YKHC gave annual preventative pediatric examinations to 976 patients; this number increased to 2770 by 2016.

== Work in the villages ==
The daily work of the dental therapist is in the rural village – tiny, almost certainly lacking in comfortable amenities, and usually completely cut off from the rest of the world, accessible only by small aircraft and snowmobiles in the winter. The villages may contain as few as a few dozen people or as many as 750.

To practice dentistry here, the dental therapist must fly in both him or her and most of the equipment needed. Not all villages have dedicated clinics where the therapists can work. Instead, once there, the therapist must utilize back rooms, living rooms, stores, and even garages to set up the operation, and, quite often, this area also becomes the therapist's living quarters for the duration of his/her stay in the village. A therapist is lucky if this temporary living space comes equipped with running water or a working septic system – often, more primitive solutions are required. Their stay can often resemble a camping trip, and a therapist is expected to bring his or her own sleeping bag and toiletries.

Once there, the work must be done quickly in order to make sure everyone who needs care receives it before the dental therapist's supplies are exhausted. This often makes for an intense work schedule, and patients are operated on and sent on their way as quickly as possible.

In rural areas, dentists often see patients in an extra room, possibly in a local school or other communal establishment, caring for as many of the villagers as possible in the span of a week or two. In some of the larger villages, established local healthcare offices exist with rooms for patients.
