= Council of Interstate Testing Agencies =

Dentists' examination center in the US

Council of Interstate Testing Agencies (CITA) was one of five examination agencies for dentists in the United States. In 2020, the other examination agencies are, Central Regional Dental Testing Service, West Regional Examining Board, Northeast Regional Board of Dental Examiners (later called the Commission on Dental Competency Assessments), and Southern Regional Testing Agency. These were organized to standardize clinical exams for licensure. The CITA examination is recognized for licensure in a total of twenty-six (26) states/territories.

== History of CITA ==
CITA formed in 2005 and allowed for member states to deliver an examination for dental and dental hygiene candidates that provided a uniform standard in predominately southern US states. Member states that help create the exam are: Alabama, Kentucky, Louisiana, North Carolina, West Virginia, and Puerto Rico.

In 2010, CITA began delivering the American Board of Dental Examiners (ADEX) examinations, which widely improved the portability of examination results for candidates.

On August 1, 2022, CITA merged with CDCA-WREB, creating CDCA-WREB-CITA.

As of September 1, 2025, CDCA-WREB-CITA is now the American Board of Dental Examiners, following a merger of the forenamed organization with the examination development agency.
