= Esther Wilkins =

American dental hygienist and author (1916–2016)

Esther M. Wilkins
- Born: December 9, 1916; Chelmsford, Massachusetts, U.S.
- Died: December 12, 2016 (aged 100); Hudson, New Hampshire, U.S.
- Education: Simmons College (1938, B.S.); Forsyth School of Dental Hygiene (1939, RDH); Tufts University School of Dental Medicine (1949, DMD; 1966, Advanced Periodontal Certification); Eastman Dental Dispensary (Internship,1950)
- Occupations: Dentist, educator, author
- Years active: 1939–2016
- Notable work: Clinical Practice of the Dental Hygienist
- Spouse: James Gallagher (1966-1988; his death)

Esther Mae Wilkins (December 9, 1916 – December 12, 2016) was an American dental hygienist, dentist and author of the first comprehensive book on dental hygiene, Clinical Practice of the Dental Hygienist (first edition published in 1959). The dental instrument known as the Wilkins/Tufts Explorer was named after her.

== Early life ==
Born in Chelmsford, Massachusetts to Ernest Wilkins and Edith Packard, Esther Wilkins grew up in the nearby town of Tyngsborough. Her father was a handyman, and her mother was a secretary. She graduated from Lowell High School in 1934.

In 1938, she graduated from Simmons College in Boston. She first enrolled in the nursing program, but then switched to a general science major. Her interest in dental hygiene began her senior year, when one of her professors lectured on public health careers. Inspired, Wilkins walked over to the children's dental clinic at the Forsyth School and soon decided to become a hygienist. She earned a certificate from the Forsyth School of Dental Hygiene in 1939.

== Career ==
After receiving her certificate in dental hygiene, Wilkins took a position with dentist Frank Willis, D13, in Manchester-by-the-Sea, Massachusetts. After several years as a hygienist, she applied for a degree in dentistry at Tufts University and was accepted for the class of 1948. The dean convinced her to defer to avoid being the only female student in the class. Following his advice, Wilkins entered the program the next year, where she was one of three women. At the time, less than 2 percent of U.S. dentists were women.

After graduating from Tufts, Wilkins completed an internship in children's dentistry at Eastman Dental Dispensary in Rochester, New York in 1950. Sponsored by Kodak founder George Eastman, the dispensary offered free dental services to low-income children.

In 1950, she founded the dental hygiene program at the University of Washington, Seattle's School of Dentistry. She developed the curriculum and taught most of the courses offered.

Realizing a need for up-to-date textbooks on dental hygiene, Wilkins began writing and mimeographing handouts for her students. Over the years, the stack of papers accumulated, and soon Wilkins was approached by a textbook seller about turning her writing into a book. The first edition of Clinical Practice of the Dental Hygienist was published in 1959. The book has since become a cornerstone of text in dental hygiene programs. Wilkins released updated editions of the textbook through its 12th edition in 2016. The book has been translated into many languages, including Japanese, Italian, Korean, Portuguese, and Canadian French, and is used in dental hygiene schools around the world.

After 12 years at the University of Washington, Wilkins returned to the Tufts University School of Dental Medicine to earn an Advanced Periodontal Certification in 1966. She became a clinical professor at the university's School of Dentistry in 1966 and taught there for 45 years. In 2011, she became a professor emeritus.

She launched the Esther Wilkins Education Program to provide dental hygiene professionals with tools and lessons to educate children about oral health.

== Awards and recognition ==
- Tufts University School of Dental Medicine Dean's Medal, 2016
- Lucy Hobbs Project Industry Icon Award, 2015
- International College of Dentists, Distinguished Service Award, 2013
- Gies Award for Achievement by a Dental Educator, 2012
- American Dental Hygienists' Association, 2010
- Gavel Medal for Dental Education, 2008
- The city of Boston declared December 9, 2006 Esther M. Wilkins Day.

== Legacy ==
Two awards have been established in her name: the Esther Wilkins Lifetime Achievement Award, by Dimensions of Dental Hygiene The Journal of Professional Excellence, and the Dr. Esther M. Wilkins Distinguished Alumni Award, by the Forsyth School for Dental Hygienists.

In 2004, Wilkins received an honorary degree from the Massachusetts College of Pharmacy and Health Sciences for her achievements in the practice and advancement of dental hygiene.

She established the Esther M. Wilkins Endowed Scholarship in 2011.

== Works ==
- Clinical Practice of the Dental Hygienist (editions 1–12)
- Little Book of Dental Hygienist's Rules (1997)

== Personal life ==
In 1966, Wilkins married a former dentistry classmate, James B. Gallagher. They were married for 22 years until Gallagher's death in 1988.

== Death ==
Wilkins died of a stroke on December 12, 2016, at a nursing home in Hudson, New Hampshire. Her death came three days after her 100th birthday.
