= Berenson-Eggers Type of Service =

Berenson-Eggers Type of Service (BETOS) categories are used to analyze Medicare costs. All Health Care Financing Administration Common Procedure Coding System (HCPCS) procedure codes are assigned to a BETOS category. BETOS codes are clinical categories. There are seven high-level BETOS categories:

- Evaluation and Management
- Procedures
- Imaging
- Tests
- Durable Medical Equipment
- Other
- Exceptions/Unclassified

The Berenson-Eggers classification system was co-authored by Robert A. Berenson, MD, and colleague Dr. Egger.

The American College of Surgeons criticizes BETOS and suggests two improvements.

As of 01/27/2016, CMS stopped publishing the BETOS crosswalk file.

CMS undertook an effort to revise and update the BETOS codes to reflect current coding practices. The new structure is referred to as the Restructured BETOS Classification System (RBCS).
