= HCPC =

The abbreviation HCPC may refer to:

- Health and Care Professions Council: The statutory regulator of health and care professionals in the United Kingdom
- Healthcare Common Procedure Coding System: A set of health care procedure codes used in the United States.
- HeartCatch PreCure!, the seventh installment of the Pretty Cure franchise, released in 2010.
- HappinessCharge Pretty Cure!, the eleventh installment of the Pretty Cure franchise, released in 2014.
