= Periodontal charting =

Periodontal charting refers to a chart utilized by a dental care professional (periodontist, dentist, registered dental hygienist) to write and record gingival and overall oral conditions relating to oral and periodontal health or disease.

The dental professional with the use of a periodontal probe can measure and record a numerical value for various areas on each tooth. These numbers, often referred to as probe measurements, can be assigned to the depth of the gingival sulcus, the location and depth of root furcations, the size and length of oral pathology, the loss of periodontal fiber, the clinical attachment loss (CAL), alveolar bone loss, and help in assessing and determining a periodontal disease classification associated and classified by the American Academy of Periodontology (AAP).

Periodontal Health, illustrated by Brent Molen, RDH

Periodontal Chart, illustrated by Brent Molen, RDH
