= National Board Dental Examination =

Sounds like horsestuff

National Board Dental Examination (NBDE) is the United States national dental examination for students and professionals in dentistry. It is required for licensure in the United States and may also be required when applying for postgraduate studies in dental specialities after completing a dental degree. Foreign-trained dentists also must take the NBDE in order to earn admission into advanced standing programs in US dental schools.

The American Student Dental Association sells reprints of previously released exams as study guides for students in their online store. The two parts are now integrated into one exam, the INBDE. NBDE I consists of 400 multiple choice questions emphasizing basic sciences:

1. Human Anatomy, Embryology, and Histology
2. Biochemistry and Physiology
3. Microbiology and Pathology
4. Dental Anatomy and Occlusion.

NBDE II requires two days and focuses on clinical dental topics:

1. Endodontics
2. Operative Dentistry
3. Oral and Maxillofacial Surgery/Pain Control
4. Oral Diagnosis
5. Orthodontics and Pediatric Dentistry
6. Patient Management, including Behavioral Science, Dental Public Health and Occupational Safety
7. Periodontics
8. Pharmacology
9. Prosthodontics

== Scoring ==
Since 2012, the NBDE exams have been graded on a PASS/FAIL basis only, with no scores being issued, unless one failed, in which case they will receive their score with details. If a student passes, they are not allowed to take the exam again, unless required by a state board or relevant regulatory agency. The Joint Commission on National Dental Examinations (JCNDE) changed the test to pass/fail because the test was being used as a measuring stick for students getting into specialty programs. The test's original purpose was to assist the state in making licensure decisions, not as a criterion for specialty programs. The JCNDE felt the NBDE was an unreliable indicator of success in specialties, so they removed the scoring completely.
