= Western Regional Examining Board =

The Western Regional Examining Board (WREB) was one of five examination agencies for dentists and dental hygienists in the United States. The other examination agencies were/are, Council of Interstate Testing Agencies, Central Regional Dental Testing Service, Northeast Regional Board of Dental Examiners (later the Commission on Dental Competency Assessments), Southern Regional Testing Agency. These were organized to better standardize clinical exams for licensure. In 2021, WREB merged with the Commission on Dental Competency Assessments. WREB examinations were no longer given after 2022.

States that accept historical WREB examination results are shown below.

US STATES	WREB ACCEPTING STATES (YES / NO)
ALABAMA	YES
ALASKA	YES
ARIZONA	YES
ARKANSAS	YES
CALIFORNIA	YES
COLORADO	YES
CONNECTICUT	YES
DC	NO
DELAWARE	NO
FLORIDA	NO
GEORGIA	NO
HAWAII	YES
IDAHO	YES
ILLINOIS	YES
INDIANA	YES
IOWA	YES
KANSAS	YES
KENTUCKY	YES
LOUISIANA	NO
MAINE	YES
MARYLAND	NO
MASSACHUSETTS	YES
MICHIGAN	YES
MINNESOTA	YES
MISSISSIPPI	YES
MISSOURI	YES
MONTANA	YES
N CAROLINA	NO
NEBRASKA	YES
NEVADA	YES
NEW JERSEY	NO
NEW HAMPSHIRE	NO
NEW MEXICO	YES
NEW YORK	NO
NORTH DAKOTA	YES
OHIO	YES
OKLAHOMA	YES
OREGON	YES
PENNSYLVANIA	YES
PUERTO RICO	NO
RHODE ISLAND	YES
S CAROLINA	NO
SOUTH DAKOTA	YES
TENNESSEE	YES
TEXAS	YES
UTAH	YES
VERMONT	NO
VIRGINIA	YES
WASHINGTON	YES
WEST VIRGINIA	YES
WISCONSIN	YES
WYOMING	YES
