= Robert A. Berenson =

American physician and academic

Dr. Robert A. Berenson is an American former physician and academic based in Washington, D.C. Born in Elizabeth, New Jersey.

Berenson is best known for coauthoring the medical service classification system, the Berenson-Eggers Type of Service. To date, Berenson has published 106 articles on the topic of health policy and hospital administration.

Berenson worked as a board-certified internist for twenty years before retiring from medical practice. Berenson is a graduate of the Mount Sinai School of Medicine, a fellow of the American College of Physicians, and on the faculty at the George Washington University School of Public Health.

Berenson has been a fellow with the Urban Institution in Washington, D.C. since 2003. His work has been published in the New England Journal of Medicine, Health Affairs, and the New Republic.

In 1977 Berenson's personal essay entitled "Cholera: A Doctor's Story of Quarantine" describing Berenson's brief detention in Egypt, was published in The New York Times.

Berenson is a Fellow of the National Academy of Public Administration (United States).
