= Central Regional Dental Testing Service =

Central Regional Dental Testing Service (CRDTS) is one of five examination agencies for dentists in the United States. The other examination agencies are, West Regional Examining Board, Northeast Regional Board of Dental Examiners, Southern Regional Testing Agency, and Council of Interstate Testing Agencies. These were organized to standardize clinical exams for licensure.

Member states that help create the exam are: Colorado, Georgia, Hawaii, Illinois, Iowa, Kansas, Minnesota, Missouri, Nebraska, New Mexico, North Dakota, South Carolina, South Dakota, Washington, West Virginia, Wisconsin, and Wyoming.

Other states that accept the exam for licensure: Alabama, Arizona, Arkansas, Colorado Connecticut, Georgia, Idaho, Illinois, Indiana, Iowa, Kansas, Kentucky, Maine, Maryland, Massachusetts, Michigan, Minnesota, Missouri, Montana, Nebraska New Hampshire, New Mexico, North Dakota, Ohio, Oregon, Pennsylvania, Rhode Island, South Carolina, South Dakota, Tennessee, Texas, Utah, Virginia, Washington, West Virginia, Wisconsin, Wyoming, and Vermont.
