= Current Dental Terminology =

Current Dental Terminology (CDT) is a code set with descriptive terms developed and updated by the American Dental Association (ADA) for reporting dental services and procedures to dental benefits plans. Prior to 2010 many of the codes were published by Centers for Medicare and Medicaid Services (CMS) as HCPCS D-codes under arrangement with the ADA. Ownership and copyright of CDT remained with the ADA. In 2010 the ADA ended the CMS distribution of CDT codes, which can now be purchased from the ADA.

For the year 2013, the ADA began publishing the CDT codes on an annual basis. There are new codes, revised codes and deleted codes in each annual edition and dental professionals must update these codes to maintain compliance with HIPAA regulations. In addition, payment to dental professionals is based on the CDT code(s) reported on the ADA Claim Form, so using the most current codes helps to maximize reimbursement and minimize audit liability.

In the near future, dental professionals will be required to use diagnosis codes in support of the procedures and services they provide. The 2012 edition of the Dental Claim Form includes fields for diagnosis codes and instructions covering the use of the ICD-9-CM and ICD-10-CM coding systems. In addition to ICD-9-CM and ICD-10-CM there are other dental diagnostic coding systems under consideration, including SNODENT and EZCODES.

== See also ==
- American Dental Association
- SNOMED CT
