= Dental therapist =

Medical professional caring for teeth

A dental therapist is a member of the dental team who provides preventive and restorative dental care for children and adults. The precise role varies and is dependent on the therapist's education and the various dental regulations and guidelines of each country.

More than 50 countries allow dental therapists to provide some dental services. In the United States, dental therapists are allowed to operate in 13 states. The American Dental Association, the largest professional association of dentists in the United States, has lobbied against allowing dental therapists to practice while the Federal Trade Commission has advocated that more dental therapists would enable greater access to oral care and strengthen competition in dental services. Research shows that dental therapists provide greater access to dental care without undermining the quality of care or undermining health outcomes.

== History ==
In 1913, Dr Norman Kershaw Cox, the President of the New Zealand Dental Association, proposed a system of school clinics operated by the state and staffed by 'oral hygienists' to address the dental needs of children between the ages of 6 and 14 years. At the time, the idea was considered to be unorthodox, but in 1920, at a special meeting of the New Zealand Dental Association, 16 members voted for the adoption of school dental nurses with 7 opposed to the proposal. Such a drastic change in the voting could be accredited to the refusal of New Zealand troops during the First World War. The recruits were rejected due to rampant and uncontrolled dental diseases.

School dental nurses were to provide diagnostic and restorative services to children '...in a rigidly structured set of methods and procedures which spare her the anxiety of making choices'. In Great Britain, during the first world war, 'dental dressers' were used to carry out examinations and treatment for children in parts of England. Their role was eliminated by the Dentist Act of 1921 because of hostility to the role on the part of the dentist profession. They were later re-introduced, on the strength of the New Zealand scheme, as dental therapists when the high dental needs of children were 'rediscovered' in the 1960s, carrying out similar services but under the prescription of a dentist who carried out the examination and care plan.

The success of New Zealand's program was so significant that many countries facing similar needs adopted programs which mirrored the ones initially established in New Zealand. School dental services which followed similar training became popular in countries around the world and in 2000, 28 countries around the world utilised dental therapists. In today's modern day practices, in all previously mentioned countries dental therapists are becoming more recognised and employable due to the identifiable need for dental professionals in underserved areas.

== Training ==
=== Australia ===
Dental therapists are no longer trained in Australia, and instead oral health therapists are being trained. An oral health therapist is trained as both a dental therapist and a dental hygienist with a focus on health promotion and disease prevention.

Oral health therapy training occurs at university level and therefore completion of secondary schooling to a high standard is mandatory, including certain pre-requisite subjects that differ between states/territories and between the universities that offer the courses themselves.

The training varies, depending on what is offered at each university, but the golden rule is that once graduated an oral health therapist can only perform what they have been formally trained in.

The average salary of a dental therapist in Australia is generally $1150.00 per week being full-time and before tax. A benefit of working in this profession is that dental therapists work normal business hours.

=== New Zealand ===
From 2002–2016, dental therapists were trained at either University of Otago in Dunedin (at New Zealand's only Dental School) or at Auckland University of Technology. Until 2016, the qualification (Bachelor of Oral Health at Otago, Bachelor of Health Science in Oral Health at AUT) enabled graduates to register and practise as both a dental therapist and dental hygienist.

Development of the dental therapists began in New Zealand. They were initially trained as 'school dental nurses', providing preventive and simple restorative care to children aged up to 12 years old. They were employed to treat children at a school dental service including treatment of preschool children.

From 1921 to 1990 the Department of Health ran the Wellington School for Dental Nurses, which offered a two-year certificate. In 1952 this programme was extended with the creation of the Auckland School for Dental Nurses, and in 1956 it was again extended by opening the Christchurch School for Dental Nurses. Both Auckland and Christchurch Schools closed in 1981. In 1991, the profession was renamed from 'school dental nurse' to 'dental therapist' to align with overseas designations, and training was taken over by the Department of Education. Training continued in Wellington, at Wellington Polytechnic. The qualification offered was a two-year Certificate in Dental Therapy, which in 1995 was changed to a two-year Diploma in Dental Therapy.

In 1999 University of Otago took over the two-year Diploma in Dental Therapy, which was offered until the introduction of the BOH degree in 2007.

In 2002, both University of Otago and AUT debuted three-year Bachelor of Health Science degrees. The Otago degree was endorsed in dental therapy, while the AUT degree was in oral health, but still only allowed for registration as a therapist. At Otago, this was offered in addition to the two-year diploma. Both degrees were discontinued in 2007. The current 'dual degree' was introduced at AUT in 2006 and at Otago in 2007. This was in response to a shortage and increased legislative requirements.

In order to practise, all therapists must annually register with the Dental Council. For the 2014–2015 cycle, the cost of this is $758.23. One therapist is represented on the council for a three-year term.

Dental therapists in New Zealand work exclusively with children under 18 years old. Their duties include examination and routine dental treatment and prevention work, such as fillings, fissure sealants and extractions of first teeth. Duties may also include giving local anaesthetic and taking X-rays. Therapists also advise patients and their parents how to care for the patient's mouth.

Dental therapists generally work for a local District Health Board (DHB), but some work in private practice.

Dental therapists could become members of the New Zealand Dental & Oral Health Therapists Association until its merger with the New Zealand Dental Hygienists' Association into the New Zealand Oral Health Association 2021. The association was founded in 1935, as the New Zealand State Dental Nurses' Institute.

=== United Kingdom ===
Some of the procedures carried out by UK dental therapists include examinations, taking radiographs (X-rays), fillings (restorations), implementing preventive strategies (fluoride application, dental sealants (fissure seals), oral hygiene instruction) and dental health education.

=== United States ===
Alaska began its dental therapist program 2004, the first in the United States, to address gaps in rural dental healthcare using a model developed after New Zealand's. An early sponsor, the W.K. Kellogg Foundation, then funded similar programs in Kansas, New Mexico, Ohio, Vermont and Washington. However, Minnesota was the next state to pass legislation authorizing dental therapists and the first to approve a non-tribal program. Dental therapists are allowed to operate in 13 states as of 2025: Alaska, Arizona, Colorado, Connecticut, Idaho, Michigan, Minnesota, Maine, New Mexico, Nevada, Oregon, Vermont, Washington, and Wisconsin. This is an increase from 2013, when only Alaska and Minnesota permitted dental therapists to practice. The American Dental Association, the largest professional association of dentists in the United States, has lobbied against allowing dental therapists to practice while the Federal Trade Commission has advocated that more dental therapists would enable greater access to oral care and strengthen competition in dental services. Research shows that dental therapists provide greater access to dental care without undermining the quality of care or undermining health outcomes.

A 2013 report by an advisory panel of academics, assembled by the non-profit consumer advocacy group Community Catalyst, stated that, "As members of the oral health team, dental therapists provide restorative dental treatment services, disease prevention and oral health promotion programs to maintain and improve health." The panel recommended several specific "minimum standards of quality" for use by educational programs for aspiring dental therapists.

Scope of practice varies by state; some states distinguish between the scope of practice of dental therapists (DTs) and advanced dental therapists (ADTs).

== Responsibilities ==
The following tasks are regularly performed by dental therapists:

- Educate patients, parents, schools and communities about the progression of dental disease, how to prevent dental disease and how to maintain good oral health.
- Treat patients via giving comprehensive oral examination, dietary advice, help to modify any risk factors for dental disease, give oral hygiene instruction to patient and parent/guardian, remove and fill dental caries. Extract deciduous (baby) teeth under local anaesthetic, perform pulpotomy treatment on indicated deciduous teeth, take radiographs of the patient's teeth, provide dental sealant protection when necessary, administer fluoride therapy and provide a professional cleaning.
- Refer and Communicate - dental therapists are able to refer to a dentist when a problem becomes complex, they work within schools, including canteens in recommending healthy options for students and staff. They can give oral hygiene instruction to classes and can communicate with other health care providers (i.e. immunisation clinics and maternal health care nurses).

== See also ==
- Dental technician
- Denturist
