= Journal of the American Dental Association =

- Discipline: Dentistry
- Language: English

Publication details
- Former name: Dental Cosmos
- History: 1913 to present
- Publisher: Elsevier for the American Dental Association (United States)
- Frequency: Monthly

Standard abbreviations
- ISO 4: J. Am. Dent. Assoc.

Indexing
- ISSN: 0002-8177

Links
- Journal homepage; JADA at Elsevier; ScienceDirect

The Journal of the American Dental Association is a monthly peer-reviewed medical journal on dentistry published by the American Dental Association. It is freely available to the public after a one-year embargo. The journal was first published in 1913 as Official Bulletin of the National Dental Association. It was renamed The Journal of the National Dental Association in 1915, and Journal of the American Dental Association in 1922. It merged with Dental Cosmos in 1936. Marjorie Jeffcoat became the first female editor of the journal in 2001.

The editor is Dr. Jeffrey Platt of the Indiana University School of Dentistry.

== Dental Cosmos ==
JADA absorbed Dental Cosmos in 1936. Dental Cosmos was the first monthly record of dental sciences in the United States. It was founded in 1859 in Philadelphia. The journal published articles related to dentistry from 1859 until 1936, when it merged with the Journal of the American Dental Association. The archived articles are hosted in the University of Michigan's online library. The merged journal was published as Journal of the American Dental Association and The Dental Cosmos for two years, and then reverted to Journal of the American Dental Association in 1939.
