= HCPCS Level 2 =

Medical procedure codes

HCPCS Level II codes are alphanumeric medical procedure codes, primarily for non-physician services such as ambulance services and prosthetic devices. They represent items, supplies and non-physician services not covered by CPT-4 codes (Level I). Level II codes are composed of a single letter in the range A to V, followed by 4 digits. Level II codes are maintained by the US Centers for Medicare and Medicaid Services (CMS). There is some overlap between HCPCS codes and National Drug Code (NDC) codes, with a subset of NDC codes also in HCPCS, and vice versa. The CMS maintains a crosswalk from NDC to HCPCS in the form of an Excel file. The crosswalk is updated quarterly.

== Types of Level II codes ==
The letters at the beginning of HCPCS Level II codes have the following meanings:

- A-codes (example: A0021): Transportation, Medical & Surgical Supplies, Miscellaneous & Experimental
- B-codes (example: B4034): Enteral and Parenteral Therapy
- C-codes (example: C1300): Temporary Hospital Outpatient Prospective Payment System
- D-codes: Dental Procedures
- E-codes (example: E0100): Durable Medical Equipment
- G-codes (example: G0008): Temporary Procedures & Professional Services
- H-codes (example: H0001): Rehabilitative Services
- J-codes (example: J0120): Drugs Administered Other Than Oral Method, Chemotherapy Drugs
- K-codes (example: K0001): Temporary Codes for Durable Medical Equipment Regional Carriers
- L-codes (example: L0112): Orthotic/Prosthetic Procedures
- M-codes (example: M0064): Medical Services
- P-codes (example: P2028): Pathology and Laboratory
- Q-codes (example: Q0035): Temporary Codes
- R-codes (example: R0070): Diagnostic Radiology Services
- S-codes (example: S0012): Private Payer Codes
- T-codes (example: T1000): State Medicaid Agency Codes
- V-codes (example: V2020): Vision/Hearing Services

There are three important HCPCS Level 2 codes for digital mammograms that often used (G0202, G0204 and G0206). The original mammogram codes (film based mammograms) are CPT codes (77055, 77056, and 77057), so it would be easy to overlook the increasingly used digital mammogram codes that remain as HCPCS Level 2 codes if one did not know they existed (and possibly under-report mammogram statistics).
