= Norman Kershaw Cox =

New Zealand dentist and dental health reformer

Norman Kershaw Cox (1 December 1869 – 28 December 1949) was a New Zealand dentist and dental health reformer.

Cox was born in Preston, Lancashire, England on 1 December 1869. His family moved to New Zealand in 1880, where his father continued to practise as a dentist. Cox graduated from the University of Auckland before going to the United States to study at the University of Michigan where he gained degrees in dentistry and medicine. His sister Jessie was the first woman to qualify as a dentist in New Zealand.

Upon returning from the United States, Cox settled in Timaru, where he practised dentistry for 45 years. On 9 October 1899, he married Florence Mabel Moss in Greymouth. In 1913, he became president of the New Zealand Dental Association, and advocated the establishment of a state-funded dental service. He always argued that the state should provide quality dental treatment at a cost that could be afforded by all. Some of his ideas were later adopted.

Cox was actively involved in sport and community life. He played cricket and rugby for South Canterbury and was later involved in the administration of both sports in the region. He was also an enthusiastic mountaineer.

Florence Cox died in 1934, and Cox married Kathleen Ruth Knox-Elliott in Dunedin on 6 January 1936. They spent their later years in Christchurch, where he died in December 1949, aged 80.
