= American Dental Hygienists' Association =

- Formation: 1923
- Type: professional association
- Headquarters: Chicago, Illinois
- Location: United States
- Members: 40,000 +
- Official language: English
- 2022-2023 President: Dawn Ann Dean, RDH, MSDH, CTTS, FADHA
- Key people: Ann Battrell, MSDH
- Staff: 20 +
- Website: adha.org

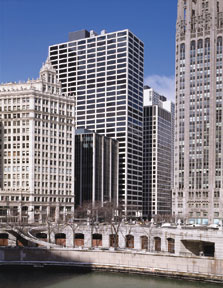
The American Dental Hygienists' Association headquarters building in Chicago

The American Dental Hygienists' Association (ADHA) is the largest national United States organization representing the professional interests of more than 185,000 dental hygienists across the country. Dental hygienists are preventive oral health professionals, licensed in dental hygiene, who provide educational, clinical and therapeutic services that support total health through the promotion of oral health. Its headquarters are in the Near North Side, Chicago.

Two major publications are produced by ADHA—a national magazine and a scientific journal—as well as a number of specialty newsletters.

== Overview ==
The ADHA was formed in 1923 to develop communication and mutual cooperation among dental hygienists.

In 1964 the ADHA deleted the word "female" from its constitution and bylaws.

Today the ADHA has 51 constituent (state) and more than 350 component (local) organizations.

The association has more than 40 employees at its headquarters in Chicago. The Board of Trustees, the administrative body of the Association, is composed of the President, the President-elect, the Vice President, the Immediate Past-president, the Treasurer, and the 12 trustees from each of the 12 trustee districts in the United States.

The House of Delegates is the legislative body of the American Dental Hygienists' Association. Composed of 151 delegates, the House adopts policy statements and elects the officers of the association during its annual session each June.

The Board of Trustees is the administrative body of the American Dental Hygienists' Association which adopts the strategic plan, annual budget and position papers. The 17 members of the board include the officers and 12 trustees, each representing a district.

The ADHA has seven councils, each composed of four voting members, a board advisor and in some cases an ex officio member. The councils are:

- Council on Education
- Council on Member Services
- Council on Policy & Bylaws
- Council on Public Health
- Council on Public Relations
- Council on Regulation and Practice
- Council on Research

The ADHA also has a number of standing committees and task forces.

== Institute for Oral Health ==
The ADHA Institute for Oral Health (IOH) is a charitable foundation created by dental hygienists for dental hygienists to provide funding for educational scholarships, fellowships, research grants, and community service grants throughout the United States.

== Publications ==
Access is a magazine that focuses on health and practice news, professional issues, and legislative developments.

The Journal of Dental Hygiene is the refereed, scientific publication of the American Dental Hygienists' Association. It promotes the publication of original research related to the practice and education of dental hygiene. It supports the development and dissemination of a dental hygiene body of knowledge through scientific inquiry in basic, applied, and clinical research. Starting with the Summer 2004 issue, the Journal is published exclusively online, and is distributed six times a year. A printed supplement issue is distributed each year onsite during the association's Center for Lifelong Learning at the Annual Session.
