= Dental hygienist =

Medical professional

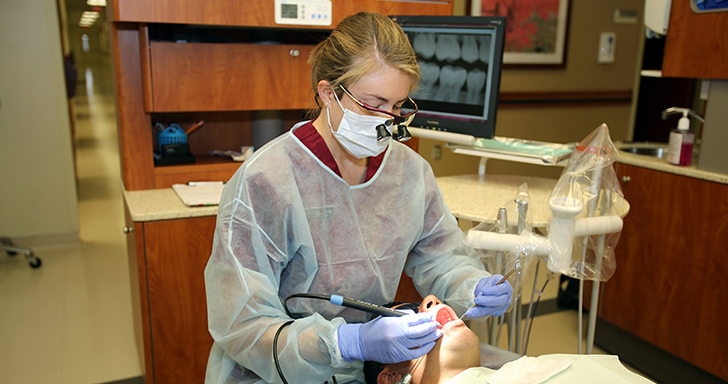

Occupation
- Activity sectors: Dentistry

Description
- Competencies: Biomedical knowledge, manual dexterity, critical thinking, analytical skills, and communication
- Education required: Associates of Dental Hygiene or Bachelors Degree in Dental Hygiene

A dental hygienist or oral hygienist is a licensed dental professional, registered with a dental association or regulatory body within their country of practice. Prior to completing clinical and written board examinations, registered dental hygienists must have either an associate's or bachelor's degree in dental hygiene from an accredited college or university. Once registered, hygienists are primary healthcare professionals who work independently of or alongside dentists and other dental professionals to provide full oral health care. They have the training and education that focus on and specialize in the prevention and treatment of many oral diseases.

Dental hygienists have a specific scope of clinical procedures they provide to their patients. They assess a patient's condition in order to offer patient-specific preventive and educational services to promote and maintain good oral health. A major role of a dental hygienist is to perform periodontal therapy which includes things such periodontal charting, periodontal debridement (scaling and root planing), prophylaxis (preventing disease) or periodontal maintenance procedures for patients with periodontal disease. The use of therapeutic methods assists their patients in controlling oral disease, while providing tailored treatment plans that emphasize the importance of behavioral changes. Some dental hygienists are licensed to administer local anesthesia and perform dental radiography. Dental hygienists are also the primary resource for oral cancer screening and prevention. In addition to these procedures, hygienists may take intraoral radiographs, apply dental sealants, administer topical fluoride, and provide patient-specific oral hygiene instruction.

Dental hygienists work in a range of dental settings, from independent, private, or specialist practices to the public sector. Dental hygienists work together with dentists, dental therapists, oral health therapists, as well as other dental professionals. Dental hygienists aim to work inter-professionally to provide holistic oral health care in the best interest of their patient. Dental hygienists also offer expertise in their field and can provide a dental hygiene diagnosis, which is an integral component of the comprehensive dental diagnosis.

== Occupational hazards ==
=== Ergonomic hazards ===
Dental hygiene is a profession that has a very close relationship with musculoskeletal disorders, which involve pain in the shoulders, arms, wrists, hands, back, and neck. Repeated strain on the tendons, muscles, nerves and joints during clinical tasks can lead to various disorders such as tendonitis, tennis elbow, and carpal tunnel syndrome. Carpal tunnel syndrome is located in the hands and wrists and causes numbing, tingling, and pain. It is one of the most common musculoskeletal disorders among dental hygienists. The posture of a hygienist, alongside repetitive motions, can lead to the development of musculoskeletal disorders as precise movements with instruments and static postures can induce physical strain on the body. Dental hygiene is a repetitive career. Those who have a heavier patient workload are linked to experiencing more pain. Pain often begins in hygienists within the first 6-10 years of practice. Strain on the body accumulates over time, beginning with hygienists who are still students practicing long hours. The problem will keep growing into their later careers. The instruments in the job play a vital role in contributing to the development of the conditions since there are tools that are very thin. To use them, there needs to be precise movement and holding of the tool, which can cause strains around the hands. Micromotor hand pieces and ultrasonic devices play a role too and they can all lead to tenosynovitis, inflammation of both a tendon and surrounding protective areas. Untreated musculoskeletal disorder symptoms can lead to conditions becoming chronic. To target the cause, both hygienists and employers can set up the workplace to be more efficient and safe.

=== Biological Hazards ===
Dental hygienists are regularly exposed to biological hazards and potentially health risks while performing clinical procedures. For instance, during ultrasonic scaling or simple procedures like a simple clean up they may come into contact with blood, saliva, and other potentially infectious materials due to their close proximity to patients. For example, ultrasonic scaling procedures which use high frequency vibrations to remove dental plaque and can generate droplets, splatter, and aerosols that may reach dental hygienist's eyes, nose, mouth, or damaged skin. These exposures are concerning because the aerosol generated from the dental procedures may contain microorganisms that can cause infections. Blood may also be present in saliva even when it might be invisible to the naked eye which can be threatening to the worker. What I mean by this is contact with infected blood can put dental hygienists at risk of bloodborne infections such as hepatitis B, hepatitis C, and HIV through needlestick injuries, cuts from contaminated tools, or contact with the eyes, nose, mouth, or broken skin.

In a questionnaire study of 237 dental hygienists who rated 15 occupational hazards of ultrasonic scaling, Park et al found that biological hazards had the highest proportions of high-risk individuals (32.9%), and high-risk levels were more common in dental clinics (33.6%) than in dental hospitals (16.5%). This illustrates that biological hazards are not just a theoretical risk but are real and measurable problems for hygienists. In addition, based on these findings, we can see that workplace conditions can affect how much risk dental hygienists face.

Preventing exposure is an important part of protecting health since biological hazards can pose occupational health risk to dental hygienists. The Hierarchy of Controls offers several strategies for lowering workplace exposure and risks such as administrative controls, engineering controls and personal protective equipment (PPE). For instance an engineering control for when aerosols are generated during dental procedures is using high volume evacuation systems and proper ventilation. According to Ghoneim et al. (2024), preprocedural mouth rinses, high-volume evacuation, protective eyewear, masks, filtration, and sufficient air ventilation can help reduce aerosol contamination. In addition, the Centers for Disease Control and Prevention recommends standard precautions for all patients in healthcare settings. This includes, hand hygiene, appropriate PPE, cough etiquette, sharps safety, safe injection practices, sterilization of instruments and disinfection of environmental surfaces. Moreover, administrative controls can also help reduce occupational exposure, such as infection control training and safe work procedures. Overall these prevention methods can minimize the danger of workplace infections and protect dental hygienists from biological hazards.

Chemical Hazards

There are multiple different chemical hazards that dental hygienists are exposed to while providing care, or disinfecting and cleaning instruments. These chemicals may cause skin and eye irritation, or respiratory problems. The level of exposure to these chemicals are important to consider because even if the exposure level is low, prolonged and repeated contact can cause serious health issues. Lajolo et al. (2019) carried out a systematic review of chemical hazards affecting dental hygienists, and uncovered that researchers mainly focus on latex exposure. Although this is an important factor to consider, the authors found out that there is a lack of research on the other chemicals used in dentistry that are harmful. Over time this can be damaging as dental hygienists are constantly exposed to chemicals like methacrylates, peracetic acid, mercury vapor from dental amalgam, and sometimes nitrous oxide during dental procedures for sedation. Jacobsen, N. and Hensten-Pettersen, A. (1995), created a questionnaire survey on work-related health complaints and found that “about half of the hygienists had experienced one or more health problems of dermal, systemic, sensory (eye) or respiratory nature during the last year, as compared to 37% of the female and 19% of the male control group” (Jacobsen & Hensten-Pettersen, 1995). Eventually, this exposure increases the risks of long term health issues, and can affect their ability while working. According to the NIOSH, exposure can be reduced with proper handling procedures, and using protective equipment. Safe work practices need to be implemented to prevent exposures, and industrial hygiene principles can be used to diminish those risks.

In modern dental workplaces, new methods like 3D printing have added on additional chemical exposures to dental hygienists. Nulty (2024) describes how resin-based 3D printing that's now used in dentistry releases volatile organic compounds including methacrylates, styrene, and isocyanates, that can cause respiratory irritations, and skin sensitization. Moreover, this new machinery for dentistry releases ultra fine particles that are tiny enough to travel deep into the respiratory system. Prolonged exposure to these airborne pollutants can cause cardiovascular and respiratory illnesses. This is a matter of concern because dental hygienists work around these materials resulting in repeated exposure. Nonetheless, “the health risks associated with these emissions remain underexplored” (Nulty, 2024). Overall adequate ventilation, PPE, utilizing protective equipment, labeling chemical containers, and never mixing chemicals if not instructed to are ways to reduce these chemical exposures.

== Job description and duties ==
In the dental office, the dentist and the dental hygienist work together to meet the oral health needs of patients. Since each country has its own specific regulations regarding their responsibilities, the range of services performed by hygienists varies. Some of the services provided by dental hygienists may include:

- patient screening procedures; such as assessment of oral health conditions, review of the health history, oral cancer screening, head and neck inspection, dental charting and taking blood pressure and pulse
- taking and developing dental radiographs (x-rays)
- removing calculus and plaque (hard and soft deposits) from all surfaces of the teeth
- applying preventive materials to the teeth (e.g., sealants and fluorides)
- teaching patients appropriate oral hygiene strategies to maintain oral health
- counseling patients about good nutrition and its impact on oral health
- making impressions of patients' teeth for study casts (models of teeth used by dentists to evaluate patient treatment needs)
- performing documentation and office management activities

=== Periodontal treatment ===
Gum disease is caused by a sticky film of bacteria called plaque. Plaque is always forming on teeth, but if it is not cleaned well, the bacteria in plaque can cause gums to become inflamed. When this happens, the gums pull away from the teeth and form spaces called pockets. Plaque then gets trapped in these pockets and cannot be removed with regular brushing. Untreated gum disease can lead to bone and tooth loss. If the periodontal pockets are too deep a deep cleaning (scaling and root planing) is necessary to remove the plaque in these pockets.

Scaling and root planing is a careful cleaning of the root surfaces to remove plaque and calculus from deep periodontal pockets and to smooth the tooth root to remove bacterial toxins. Scaling and root planing is sometimes followed by adjunctive therapy such as local delivery antimicrobials, systemic antibiotics, and host modulation, as needed on a case-by-case basis.

Most periodontists agree that after scaling and root planing, many patients do not require any further active treatment. However, the majority of patients will require ongoing maintenance therapy to sustain health. The maintenance phase involves continuous care, at patient specific levels.

== Timeline of dental hygienists ==
- 1906: Alfred Fones trained his chairside assistant (and his cousin), Irene M. Newman, to clean teeth and perform other preventive treatments on children, making her the world's first dental hygienist.
- 1913: Alfred Fones began the first school for dental hygienists in Connecticut.
- 1915: Connecticut amended its dental practice act to include the regulation of dental hygienists.
- 1917: Irene M. Newman received the world's first license as a dental hygienist in Connecticut in 1917.
- 1923: The first meeting of the American Dental Hygienists' Association took place.
- 1950: The University of Toronto established the first dental hygiene program in Canada.
- 1959: Esther Mae Wilkins, an American dental hygienist and dentist, authored the first comprehensive book on dental hygiene, Clinical Practice of the Dental Hygienist, the first edition of which was published in 1959.
- 1964: The American Dental Hygienists' Association deleted the word "female" from its constitution and bylaws.
- 1965: Jack Orio graduated from the University of New Mexico, making him the world's first male dental hygienist.
- 1974: Dental hygienists were first trained in New Zealand in 1974, for use in the New Zealand Defence Force. The one-year course was taught by the Royal New Zealand Dental Corp at the Burnham army base outside Christchurch.
- 1975: The dental hygiene profession was introduced in Australia.
- 1993: The New Zealand Dental Hygienists' Association was founded.
- 1994: The first independent non-military training for dental hygienists in New Zealand began in 1994.
- 2009-2010: Fiscal year The Dental Hygiene Committee of California was established
- 2018: Dental Hygiene Committee of California officially changed to the Dental Hygiene Board of California (DHBC)

== Training ==
=== Australia ===
Dental hygienists in Australia must be graduates from a dental hygiene program, with either an advanced diploma (TAFE), associate degree, or more commonly a bachelor's degree from a dental hygiene school that is accredited by the Australian Dental Council (ADC) under the Australian Health Practitioner Regulation Agency.

In Australia it is a legal requirement for dental hygienist and oral health therapist graduates to be registered with the Dental Board of Australia before practising their scope in periodontology in any state or territory in Australia.

The Dental Hygienists' Association of Australia (DHAA) Inc., established in 1975, is the peak body representing registered dental hygiene service providers in Australia.

A dental hygienist does not need to be employed by a dentist but can independently assess patients and make treatment plans within their scope of practice whilst working in the community. Practising as an autonomous decision maker, and working within the scope of only what they are "formally" trained in. The National Law requires the same level of professional responsibility from dental hygienists, oral health therapists and dental therapists as it does from dentists, dental specialists and dental prosthetists in that all practitioners must have their own professional indemnity insurance and radiation licences. They are also required to complete 60 hours of mandatory continuing professional development in a three-year cycle.

A Bachelor of Oral Health is the most common degree program. Students entering a bachelor's degree program are required to have a high school diploma or equivalent. Most Bachelor of Oral Health programs now qualify students as both dental hygienists and dental therapists, collectively known as oral health therapists.

=== Canada ===
Dental hygienists in Canada must have completed a diploma program, which can take from 19 months to 3 years to complete. All dental hygiene students must pass a NDHCB examination after graduation. This examination is offered three times per year, January, May and September. Three universities in Canada offer Bachelor of Science degrees in Dental Hygiene: Dalhousie University, University of Alberta, University of British Columbia.

Dental hygiene is a regulated health profession in Canada. Dental hygienists may work in clinical practice and in areas including administration, education, research, and public health. Wages vary across the country, with reported hourly rates ranging from approximately $40 in some areas to $65 in others. A surplus of newly graduated dental hygienists in some regions has been reported as contributing to lower wages.

Some of the downfalls to practicing in different provinces are the different regulations. For instance, in BC, the hygienist cannot provide treatment without the patient receiving a dental exam in the previous 365 days unless the practicing hygienist has an extended duty module (resident-care module). In AB, BC, MB, NS and SK, hygienists also administer local anesthesia if qualified to do so. In Ontario, dental hygienists may take further training to become a restorative dental hygienist. University based programs incorporate restorative dentistry in the clinical portion of their programs; graduates of these programs are immediately prepared for a broader scope of practice when they graduate. Registered dental hygienists must register every year by December 31. All Canadian dental hygienists must also prove continuing competence by maintaining a professional portfolio yearly.

In all provinces, dental hygienists are registered with their provincial College of Dental Hygienists.

Dental hygienists in BC, ON, NS and AB are able to open their own private clinics and practice without a dentist on staff.

=== New Zealand ===
Dental hygienists are no longer trained in New Zealand. Instead, training has been combined with that of dental therapists to train oral health therapists. Dental hygienists were first domestically trained in 1974 for use in the New Zealand Defence Force. The one-year course was taught by the Royal New Zealand Dental Corp at the Burnham army base outside Christchurch. Hygiene training was briefly offered at the Wellington School for Dental Nurses in 1990 as two-week a supplement to Dental Therapy students training. However, this was quickly discontinued.

The first independent non-military training began in 1994. Otago Polytechnic began offering a 15-month Certificate in Dental Hygiene in Dunedin. In 1998, the programme was modified to be a two-year diploma. Otago Polytech stopped offering the course in 2000. The following year, University of Otago began offering a two-year diploma in Dental Hygiene qualification. In 2002, the university added a three-year Bachelor of Health Sciences (endorsed in Dental Hygiene) degree alongside the Diploma.

From 2006, New Zealand dental hygienists and now oral health therapists have been trained at either University of Otago in Dunedin (at the country's only Dental School) or at Auckland University of Technology. Until official establishment of the oral health therapy scope in late 2017, the qualifications (Bachelor of Oral Health at Otago, Bachelor of Health Science (Oral Health) at AUT) enabled graduates to register and practise as both a dental hygienist and a dental therapist.

In order to practise, dental hygienists and oral health therapists must register and annually recertify with the Dental Council of New Zealand. One dental hygienist is represented on Council for a three-year term.

The representing body for dental hygienists was the New Zealand Dental Hygienists' Association. The association was founded in 1993, and is affiliated with the International Federation of Dental Hygienists. In 2021 the association merged with the New Zealand Dental and Oral Health Therapists Association to become the New Zealand Oral Health Association.

=== United States ===
Dental hygienists in the United States must be graduates from a dental hygiene program, with either an associate degree (most common), a certificate, a bachelor's degree or a master's degree from a dental hygienist school that is accredited by the American Dental Association (ADA).

All dental hygienists in the United States must be licensed by the state in which they practice, after completing a minimum of two years of school and passing a written board known as the National Board Dental Hygiene Examination as well as a clinical board exam. After completing these exams and licenses, dental hygienists may use "R.D.H" after their names to signify that they are a registered dental hygienist. Dental hygienists also have to become licensed in the state in which they intend to practice. State licensure requirements vary, however most states require an associate degree in Dental Hygiene, successful completion of a state licensure examination, as well as a clinical examination also typically administered by the state.

Dental hygienists school programs usually require both general education courses and courses specific to the field of dental hygiene. General education courses important to dental hygiene degrees include college level algebra, biology, and chemistry. Courses specific to dental hygiene may include anatomy, oral anatomy, materials science, pharmacology, radiography, periodontology, nutrition, and clinical skills.

A Bachelor of Science in Dental Hygiene is typically a four-year program. Students entering a bachelor's degree program are required to have a high school diploma or equivalent, but many dental hygienists with an associate degree or certification enter the bachelor's degree programs to expand their clinical expertise and help advance their careers.

Graduate degrees in the field of dental hygiene are typically two-year programs and are completed after the bachelor's degree. Common graduate courses in dental hygiene include Healthcare Management, Lab Instruction, and Clinical Instruction.

In addition, the American Dental Hygienists' Association has defined a more advanced level of dental hygiene, the Advanced Dental Hygiene Practitioner otherwise known as a dental therapist.

Dental hygienist students perform practical oral examinations free of charge at some institutions which have expressed a shortage in recent years.

== Direct access to care with a dental hygienist ==
The dental hygienists in some parts of North America can provide oral hygiene treatment based on the assessment of a patient's needs without the authorization of a dentist, treat the patient in absence of a dentist, and also maintain a provider-patient relationship.

=== India ===
The Dental Hygienist Course in India is a full-time two-year diploma course. The dental hygienist course is regulated and controlled by the Dental Council of India. After completing the course, a dental hygienist should register with a state dental council. Any registered dental hygienist in one state may practice as in any other. The Federation of Indian Dental Hygienists Association is the primary national body representing the dental hygienist profession in India, however, some state dental hygienist associations also work at the state level. In India, dental hygienists do not need to be employed by a dentist but can have their own clinic.

=== Canada ===
==== British Columbia ====
1995 - A client must have seen a dentist within the previous 365 days in order for the hygienist to provide dental hygiene treatment.

2012 - New bylaws offers an exemption from the 365-day rule if hygienists are registered in the Full Registration (365 Day Rule Exempt) class.

==== Alberta ====
2006 - Dental hygienists are able to offer their services in many practice settings including independent practice.

==== Manitoba ====
2008 - If the dental hygienist has practiced for more than 3000 hours, and the client does not have a complex medical condition then the hygienists do not require the supervision of a dentist.

==== Ontario ====
2007 - Registered dental hygienists in Ontario who have been approved by the College of Dental Hygienists of Ontario can practice independently.

=== United States ===
==== California ====
1998 - Registered dental hygienist in alternative practice (RDHAP): RDHAPs may provide services for homebound persons or at residential facilities, schools, institutions and in dental health professional shortage areas without the supervision of a dentist. RDHAPs can provide patient care for up to 18 months and longer if the patient obtains a prescription for additional oral treatment from a dentist or physician .

==== Colorado ====
1987 - Unsupervised practice: Hygienists may have their own dental hygiene practice; there are no requirement for the authorization or supervision of a dentist for most services. Colorado is currently the only state where this is approved. Case was won by JoAnn Grant, a dental hygienist from Fort Collins, CO.

==== Connecticut ====
1999 - Public health dental hygienist: dental hygienists may practice without supervision in institutions, public health facilities, group homes, and schools as long as they have two years of work experience.

==== Maine ====
2008 - Independent practice dental hygienist: A dental hygienist licensed with an independent practice may work without the supervision of a dentist, providing that the dental hygienist has to complete 2,000 work hours of clinical practice during the two years prior to applying for an independent license, as well as a bachelor's degree from a CODA accredited dental hygiene program or complete 6,000 work hours of clinical practice during the six years prior to applying for an independent license, as well as an associate degree from a CODA accredited dental hygiene program.

==== Michigan ====
2005 - PA 161 Dental hygienist: hygienists with grantee status can work in a public or nonprofit environment, a school or nursing home that administers dental care to a low-income population. Dentists collaborating with dental hygienists do not need to be present to authorize or administer treatment. However, dental hygienists must have the availability to communicate with a dentist in order to review patient records and establish emergency protocols. Hygienists need to apply to the state department of community health for grantee status.

==== Washington ====
1984 - Unsupervised practice: dental hygienist practice without the supervision of a dentist is allowed in hospitals, group homes, nursing homes, home health agencies, Health and Human Service state institutions, jails, and public health facilities as long as the hygienist refers their patients to a dentist for treatment. Hygienists must have at least two years of work experience within the last five years.

== Notable dental hygienists ==
- Janet Gardner
- Esther Wilkins
- Miriam Carey

== See also ==
- Dentist
- Dental therapist
- Dental nurse
- Dental assistant
- Periodontal disease
- Gingivitis
- Periodontitis
