= Southern Regional Testing Agency =

Southern Regional Testing Agency (SRTA) is one of five examination agencies for dentistry in the United States. Some of the other examination agencies are, Western Regional Examining Board, Central Regional Dental Testing Service, Northeast Regional Board of Dental Examiners. These were organized to better standardize clinical exams for licensure.

Member states that originally helped create the exam are: Arkansas, Kentucky, South Carolina, Tennessee, Virginia

Other states that accept the exam for licensure: Alabama, Colorado, Connecticut, Ohio, Indiana, Illinois, Kansas, Nebraska, Utah, New Hampshire, North Dakota, Maine, Wyoming, Vermont, West Virginia, Missouri, Massachusetts, Montana.

The exam contains six separate sections: Endodontics, Class III Composite, Class II Amalgam, Fixed Prosthodontics, and computer simulated examinations in Periodontics and Prosthodontics. Each section is scored on a pass/fail basis and has its own unique grading criteria. To successfully complete each section, applicants must score at least 75% for all procedures within that section, and applicants must pass all sections in order to pass the exam.
