= Dental anesthesiology =

Branch of dentistry

Dental anesthesiology is the specialty of dentistry that deals with the advanced use of general anesthesia, sedation and pain management to facilitate dental procedures.

In the United States, a dentist anesthesiologist is a dentist who has successfully completed an accredited postdoctoral anesthesiology residency program of three or more years duration, in accordance with the Commission on Dental Accreditation's standards or meets the eligibility requirements for examination by the American Dental Board of Anesthesiology.

An anesthesiologist not only has a wide arsenal of anesthesia techniques, but is also a specialist in monitoring the patient's condition during procedures. It monitors the indicators of functional systems of the patient's body, maintains its stable condition and prevents possible complications. Аn anesthesiologist in dentistry works closely with the rest of the specialists, such as implant surgeons, pediatric dentists, and adult therapists. Acting as a guarantor of patient safety and comfort, the participation in the treatment process allows for high quality dental care.

The anesthesiologist chooses the drug for general anesthesia in advance. The method of administration depends on this: inhalation through a mask or intravenous injection. At the beginning of treatment, the anesthesiologist puts the patient into a state of sleep or comfortable half-sleep. The patient's vital signs are then monitored with a heart monitor throughout the procedure. Surveillance is conducted in accordance with the expanded Harvard protocol.

General anesthesia is performed only by a qualified anesthesia team consisting of a physician anesthesiologist and a nurse anesthetist, who accompany the patient from the moment of falling asleep to full awakening.

The drugs used in anesthesiology today have a high safety profile.

== United States and Canada ==
Dental Anesthesiology is a recognized specialty of dentistry in both the United States and Canada. The American Dental Board of Anesthesiology (ADBA) examines and certifies dentists who complete an accredited program of anesthesiology training in the United States or Canada. Dentists may then apply for board certification through the ADBA which requires ongoing and continual post-graduate education for maintenance.

The American Society of Dentist Anesthesiologists is the only organization that represents dentists with three or more years of anesthesiology training.

Dental Anesthesiology was the first specialty of dentistry to be recognized by both the American Board of Dental Specialties and the National Commission on Recognition of Dental Specialties and Certifying Boards.

== See also ==
- Anesthesia
- Dentistry
