= American Board of Dental Examiners =

US examination agency for dentists

The American Board of Dental Examiners is a national dental and dental hygiene examination organization responsible for administering clinical licensure examinations used by dental boards across the United States. The organization has evolved significantly through a series of mergers designed to strengthen standardization, expand board participation, and create a unified national structure for assessment in dentistry and dental hygiene.

== History ==
The organization traces its origins to the North East Regional Board of Dental Examiners (NERB), one of the earliest regional examining boards established to promote consistency in clinical licensure examinations at a time when each state maintained its own independent exam.

- January 9, 2015 – The NERB changed its name to the Commission on Dental Competency Assessments (CDCA).
- August 3, 2021 – CDCA merged with the Western Regional Examining Board (WREB), forming CDCA-WREB.
- August 1, 2022 – CDCA-WREB merged with the Council on Interstate Testing Agencies (CITA), creating CDCA-WREB-CITA, the nation's largest dental examiner organization.
- September 1, 2025 – CDCA-WREB-CITA unified with the original American Board of Dental Examiners (ADEX), adopting that name for the consolidated organization.

== Examinations Administered ==
The American Board of Dental Examiners administers:

- ADEX Dental Examination
- ADEX Dental Hygiene Examination
- Florida Laws and Rules Examination
- Expanded Function Dental Assistant (EFDA) Examination
- Local Anesthesia, Sedation, Dental Therapy, and Nitrous Oxide Examinations

ADEX examinations are required by law in 51 U.S. jurisdictions internationally.

== Jurisdictional Acceptance ==
The organization's membership and exam acceptance footprint includes:

- 47 U.S. states
- Washington, D.C.
- Puerto Rico
- U.S. Virgin Islands
- Jamaica

State requirements are noted in the chart below.

U.S. State or Other Country	Requires ADEX Dental Exam	Requires ADEX Hygiene Exam
ALABAMA	Y	Y
ALASKA	Y	Y
ARIZONA	Y	Y
ARKANSAS	Y	Y
CALIFORNIA	Y	Y
COLORADO	Y	Y
CONNECTICUT	Y	Y
DC	Y	Y
DELAWARE	N	N
FLORIDA	Y	Y
GEORGIA	Y	Y
HAWAII	Y	Y
IDAHO	Y	Y
ILLINOIS	Y	Y
INDIANA	Y	Y
IOWA	Y	Y
JAMAICA	Y	-
KANSAS	Y	Y
KENTUCKY	Y	Y
LOUISIANA	Y	Y
MAINE	Y	Y
MARYLAND	Y	Y
MASSACHUSETTS	Y	Y
MICHIGAN	Y	Y
MINNESOTA	Y	Y
MISSISSIPPI	Y	Y
MISSOURI	Y	Y
MONTANA	Y	Y
NORTH CAROLINA	Y	Y
NEBRASKA	Y	N
NEVADA	Y	Y
NEW JERSEY	Y	Y
NEW MEXICO	Y	Y
NEW YORK	N	Y
NEW HAMPSHIRE	Y	Y
NORTH DAKOTA	Y	Y
OHIO	Y	Y
OKLAHOMA	Y	Y
OREGON	Y	Y
PENNSYLVANIA	Y	Y
PUERTO RICO	Y	-
RHODE ISLAND	Y	Y
SOUTH CAROLINA	Y	Y
SOUTH DAKOTA	Y	Y
TENNESSEE	Y	Y
TEXAS	Y	Y
UTAH	Y	Y
VERMONT	Y	Y
VIRGINIA	Y	Y
U.S. VIRGIN ISLANDS	Y	-
WASHINGTON	Y	Y
WEST VIRGINIA	Y	Y
WISCONSIN	Y	Y
WYOMING	Y	Y

Certain states also recognize other examinations a meeting some licensure requirements.
