= American Dental Association =

American professional organization based in Chicago, Illinois

- Founded: August 3, 1859; 167 years ago
- Founder: William Henry Atkinson
- Founded at: Niagara Falls, New York, U.S.
- Type: Professional association
- Tax ID no.: 36-0724690
- Legal status: 501(c)(6) nonprofit organization
- Headquarters: Chicago, Illinois, U.S.
- Location: United States
- Members: 115,736
- President: Dr. Richard Rosato
- Interim Executive director: Elizabeth A. Shapiro
- Subsidiaries: ADA Foundation; ADPAC Education Fund; ADA Business Enterprises Inc; American Dental Association Political Action Committee
- Revenue: $141,000,000
- Expenses: $157,000,000
- Employees: 463 (2019)
- Volunteers: 450 (2019)
- Website: www.ada.org

The American Dental Association (ADA) is an American professional dental association. Established in 1859 and with 115,736 current members, ADA is the world's largest and oldest national dental association. The organization lobbies on behalf of the American dental profession and provides dental accreditation.

The ADA publishes the Journal of the American Dental Association and JADA Foundational Science.

As part of its lobbying efforts, the ADA has sought to restrict non-dentists (such as dental hygienists and dental therapists) from providing basic dental care. The organization has played an important role in blocking the inclusion of dental coverage in Medicare. The ADA has expressed opposition to the opening of new dental schools or to increasing the number of dentists in the United States, even as the United States trains almost half as many dental students (relative to population) in the 2000s as it did in the 1980s.

== History ==
The American Dental Association was founded August 3, 1859, at Niagara Falls, New York, by twenty-six dentists who represented various dental societies in the United States.

The association has more than 400 employees at its headquarters in Chicago and its office in Washington, D.C. The Paffenbarger Research Center (PRC), located on the campus of the National Institute of Standards and Technology (NIST) in Gaithersburg, Maryland, an agency of the American Dental Association Foundation (ADAF) and a Department of the Division of Science. PRC scientists conduct basic and applied studies in clinical research, dental chemistry, polymer chemistry and cariology, and are used by of the ADA.

In 2024, the ADA announced it had sold its Chicago headquarters building, where it had been located for over 60 years, to Lurie Children's Hospital and would move to leased offices in 2025. In June 2025, the ADA also moved into new offices in Washington, D.C.

Historically, the ADA has discriminated against minority dentists and sought to exclude them from its affiliates. This discrimination in part prompted the creation of the National Dental Association. In 2010, the ADA apologized for its history of racial discrimination.

=== Seal of Acceptance ===
The ADA established rigorous guidelines for testing and advertising of dental products, and the first ADA Seal of Acceptance was awarded in 1931. Today, about 350 manufacturers participate in the voluntary program and more than 1,300 products have received the Seal of Acceptance.

Product manufacturers are charged $14,500 for each product the ADA evaluates. For products that are approved, manufacturers pay an annual fee of $3,500. According to the ADA, it does not make a profit from the program.

=== Organizational structure ===
The Board of Trustees, the administrative body of the association, is composed of the president, the president-elect, two vice presidents and 17 trustees from each of the 17 trustee districts in the United States. The treasurer and executive director serve as ex officio members. The House of Delegates, the legislative body of the association, is composed of 460 delegates representing 53 constituent societies, five federal dental services and the American Student Dental Association. The house meets once a year during the association's annual session.

The association's 11 councils serve as policy recommending agencies. Each council is assigned to study issues relating to its special area of interest and to make recommendations on those matters to the Board of Trustees and the House of Delegates.

The association's official publication is the Journal of the American Dental Association. Other publications include the ADA News and the ADA Guide to Dental Therapeutics.

The Commission on Dental Accreditation, which operates under the auspices of the ADA, is recognized by the U.S. Department of Education as the national accrediting body for dental, advanced dental and allied dental education programs in the United States. It is also recognized by 47 individual states.

The ADA formally recognizes nine specialty areas of dental practice: dental public health, endodontics, oral and maxillofacial pathology, oral and maxillofacial surgery, orthodontics and dentofacial orthopedics, pediatric dentistry, periodontics, prosthodontics, and oral and maxillofacial radiology. Various dental practices, such as Finest Dentistry, provide services that align with the ADA’s mission to promote public health and support advancements in dental care.

The ADA Foundation is the charitable arm of the association.

== Lobbying ==
The ADA opposes the opening of new dental schools and increases in the number of dental students. The organization has questioned federal data showing a dentist shortage in the United States. In the 1980s, dental schools graduated nearly twice as many students relative to total population as they did in the 2000s.

The ADA has a history of trying to restrict the kind of care that dental hygienists and dental therapists are allowed to provide. In many states, dental hygienists are required to be closely supervised by dentists when they provide care. In 1991, the Director of the ADA's Council on Dental Practice expressed opposition to permit dental hygienists to work unsupervised, arguing that this would harm patients and that dental hygienists "need the dentists to review their work."

After a Reader's Digest 1994 investigation revealed that dentists provided drastically different evaluations of the same patients and suggested drastically different treatments, ADA President Leslie Seldin said, "Dentistry is an art based on scientific knowledge, and what's most important to all of us is that we each use our professional judgment to design what we believe is the best solution for the patient."

In 2017, the Federal Trade Commission proposed to create a category of mid-level practitioners (dental therapists) to provide some routine dental services, which "could benefit consumers by increasing choice, competition, and access to care, especially for the underserved." The ADA lobbied against the proposal, arguing that the government should rather give more funding to dentists than allow "lesser trained" therapists to provide dental services. The ADA spent millions of dollars to block legislative proposals in various states to permit dental therapists to provide services. The ADA's own research has shown that when dentists work with dental therapists, the rate of untreated caries was lower than in dentist-only teams.

The ADA has a long history of advocating against dental coverage under national health insurance plans. In 1965, the ADA lobbied against the inclusion of dental coverage in the original Medicare program. In 2021, the ADA launched a well-funded lobbying effort against proposal to provide dental insurance coverage for all Medicare recipients. The ADA stands in contrast to the National Dental Association, which has advocated for universal dental coverage for Medicare recipients. In 2021, ADA president Cesar R. Sabates credited the exclusion of Medicare dental coverage in the Build Back Better Plan to the ADA's advocacy.

Critics of the ADA argue that the organization undermines competition in dental services and makes dental care in the United States less affordable. The ADA has also been described as an "old boys club" where licensed dentists, 70% of whom are male, restrict the kinds of services that dental hygienists (more than 95% of whom are female) can provide.

== Timeline ==
- 1859: Twenty-six dentists meet in Niagara Falls, New York, and form a professional society, named the American Dental Association.
- 1860: First ADA constitution and bylaws are adopted.
- 1897: ADA merges with the Southern Dental Association to form the National Dental Association (NDA).
- 1908: NDA publishes the first patient dental education pamphlet.
- 1913: NDA adopts a new constitution and bylaws, establishing the House of Delegates and Board of Trustees.
- 1913: The Journal of the NDA is first published, under the title, Bulletin of the National Dental Association.
- 1920: Maude Tanner becomes the first recorded female delegate to the NDA.
- 1921: During the annual meeting of the NDA, several female dentists meet in Milwaukee and form the Federation of American Women Dentists, now known as the American Association of Women Dentists (AAWD).
- 1922: NDA is renamed the American Dental Association (ADA).
- 1928: ADA affiliates with the National Bureau of Standards.
- 1930: Council of Dental Therapeutics established to oversee the evaluation of dental products. The council establishes the ADA's Seal Program.
- 1931: First ADA Seal of Approval awarded; ADA headquarters located on north side of Chicago.
- 1936: ADA Council on Dental Education is formed.
- 1950: ADA works with Congress to proclaim February 6 as National Children's Dental Health Day; ADA endorses fluoridation.
- 1964: ADA produces the first color television Public Service Announcement by a non-profit health agency; ADA establishes the ADA Health Foundation, a 501(c)(3) non-profit organization for the purpose of engaging in dental health research and educational programs.
- 1965: ADA changes its policies to urge the cessation of discrimination based on race, religion, ethnicity or creed among its member groups and affiliates.
- 1970: ADA News is first published.
- 1987: ADA Commission on the Young Professional is formed (later becomes the Committee on the New Dentist).
- 1991: First female ADA president, Geraldine Morrow, is elected.
- 1995: ADA Web site, ADA ONLINE, created (later becomes ADA.org)
- 2002: First Asian-American ADA president, Eugene Sekiguchi, is elected; he is Japanese-American.
- 2009: First female ADA executive director is chosen, Kathleen O'Loughlin.

== See also ==
- Academy of General Dentistry (AGD)
- American Student Dental Association
- Amalgam (dentistry)
- American Society of Dental Surgeons (ASDS)
- Current Dental Terminology
- Dentistry
