= Dentist =

Health care occupations caring for the mouth and teeth

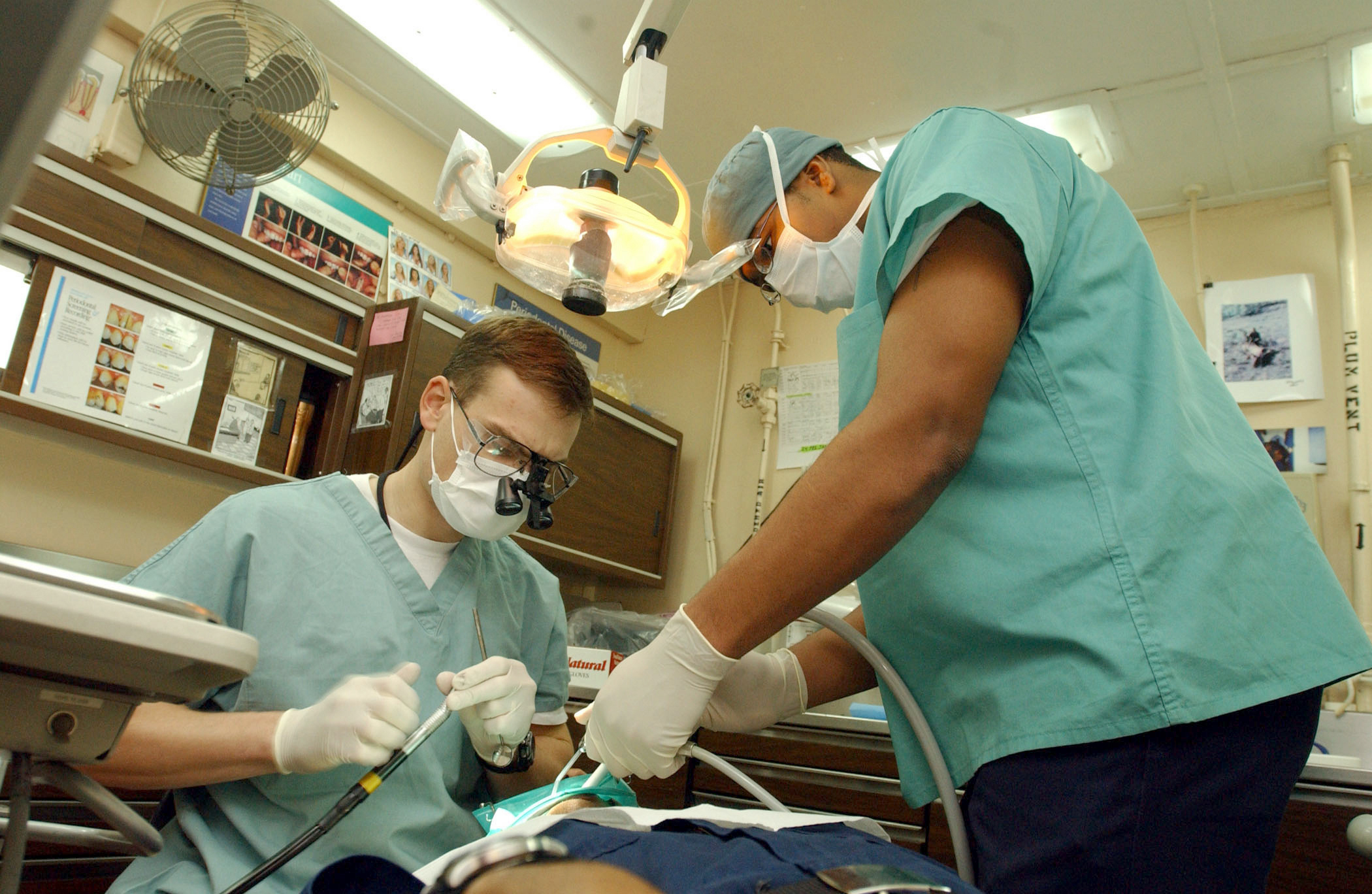
- A dentist (seated) treating a patient with the help of an assistant (standing)

Description
- Competencies: Biomedical knowledge, surgical dexterity, critical thinking, analytical skills, professionalism, management skills, and communication
- Education required: Bachelor of Dental Surgery (B.D.S); Doctor of Dental Medicine (D.M.D); Doctor of Dental Surgery (D.D.S); Doctor of Medicine (M.D.) (Specialty Programs)

A dentist, also known as a dental doctor, dental physician, dental surgeon, is a health care professional who specializes in dentistry, the branch of medicine focused on the teeth, gums, and mouth. The dentist's supporting team aids in providing oral health services. The dental team includes dental assistants, dental hygienists, dental technicians, and sometimes dental therapists.

== History ==
=== Middle Ages ===
In both China and France, the first people to practice dentistry were barbers. They have been categorized into 2 distinct groups: the guild of barbers and lay barbers. The first group, the Guild of Barbers, was created to distinguish more educated and qualified dental surgeons from lay barbers. Guild barbers were trained to do complex surgeries. The second group, the lay barbers, were qualified to perform regular hygienic services such as shaving and tooth extraction, as well as basic surgery. However, in 1400, France made decrees prohibiting lay barbers from practicing all types of surgery. In Germany, as well as in France, from 1530 to 1575, publications completely devoted to dentistry were being published. Ambroise Paré, often known as the Father of Surgery, published his own work about the proper maintenance and treatment of teeth. Ambroise Paré was a French barber-surgeon who performed dental care for multiple French monarchs. He is often credited with having raised the status of barber-surgeons.

=== Modern dentistry ===
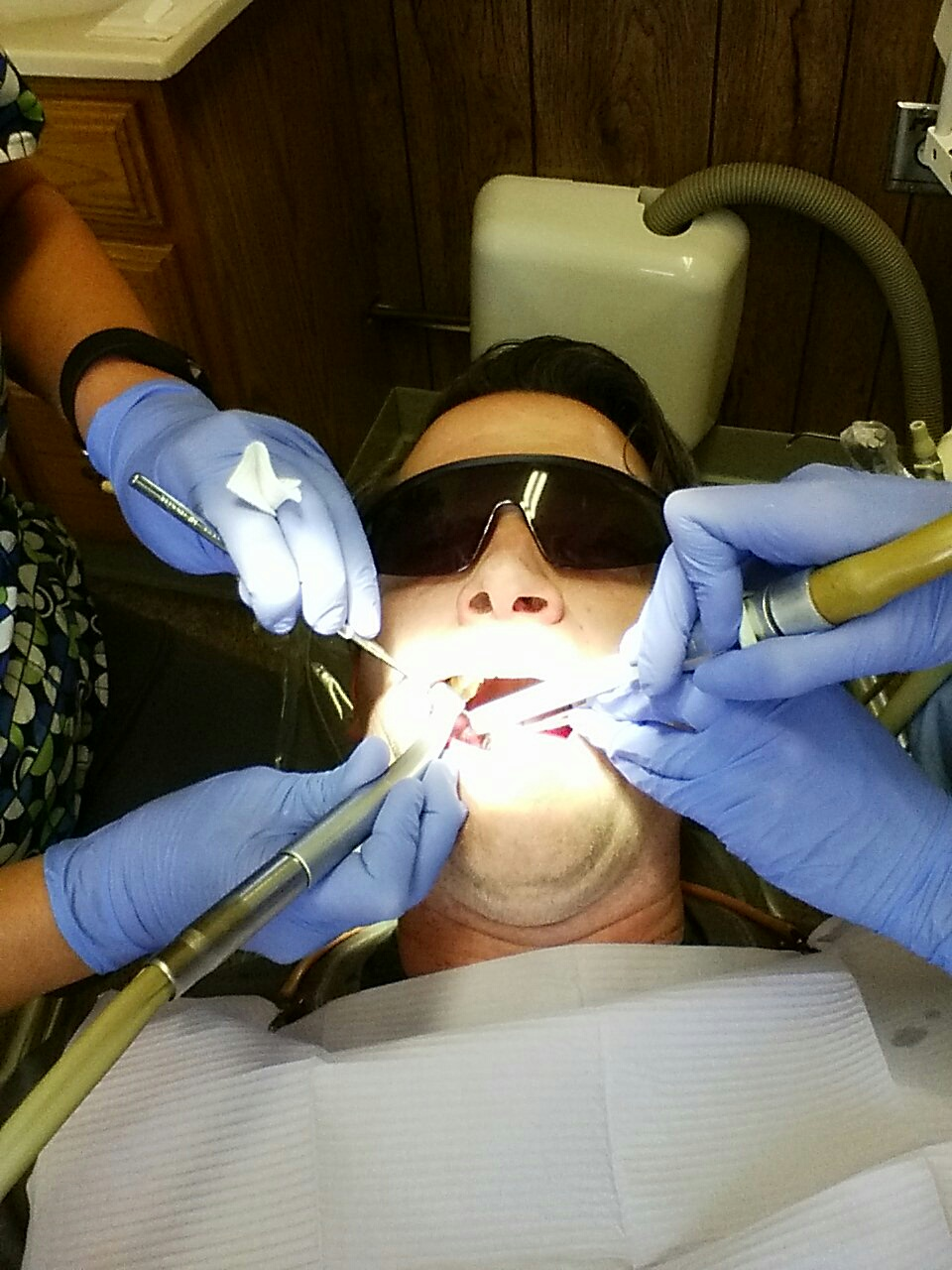
A man being treated by a dental team

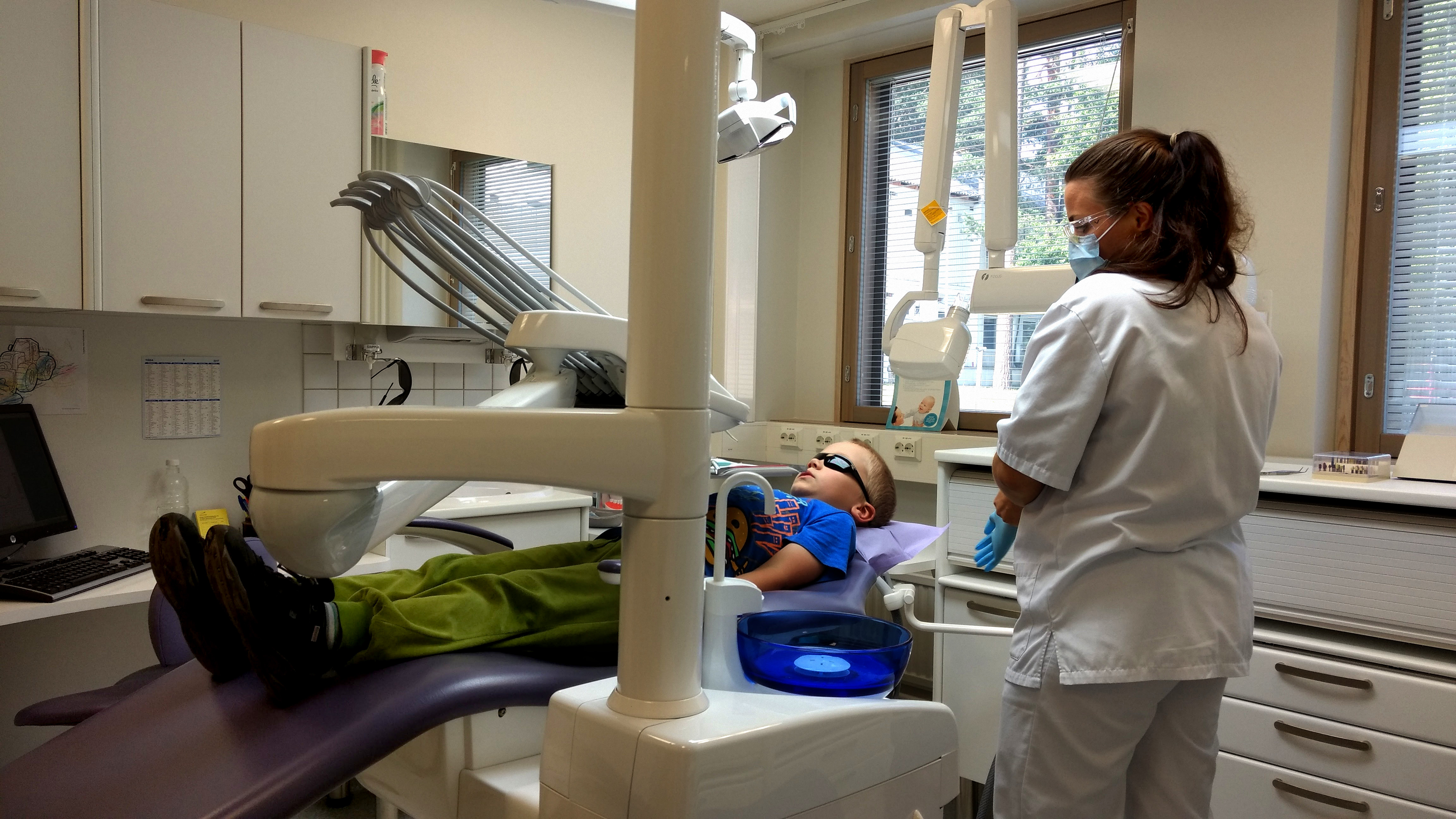
A modern dental treatment in Lappeenranta, Finland

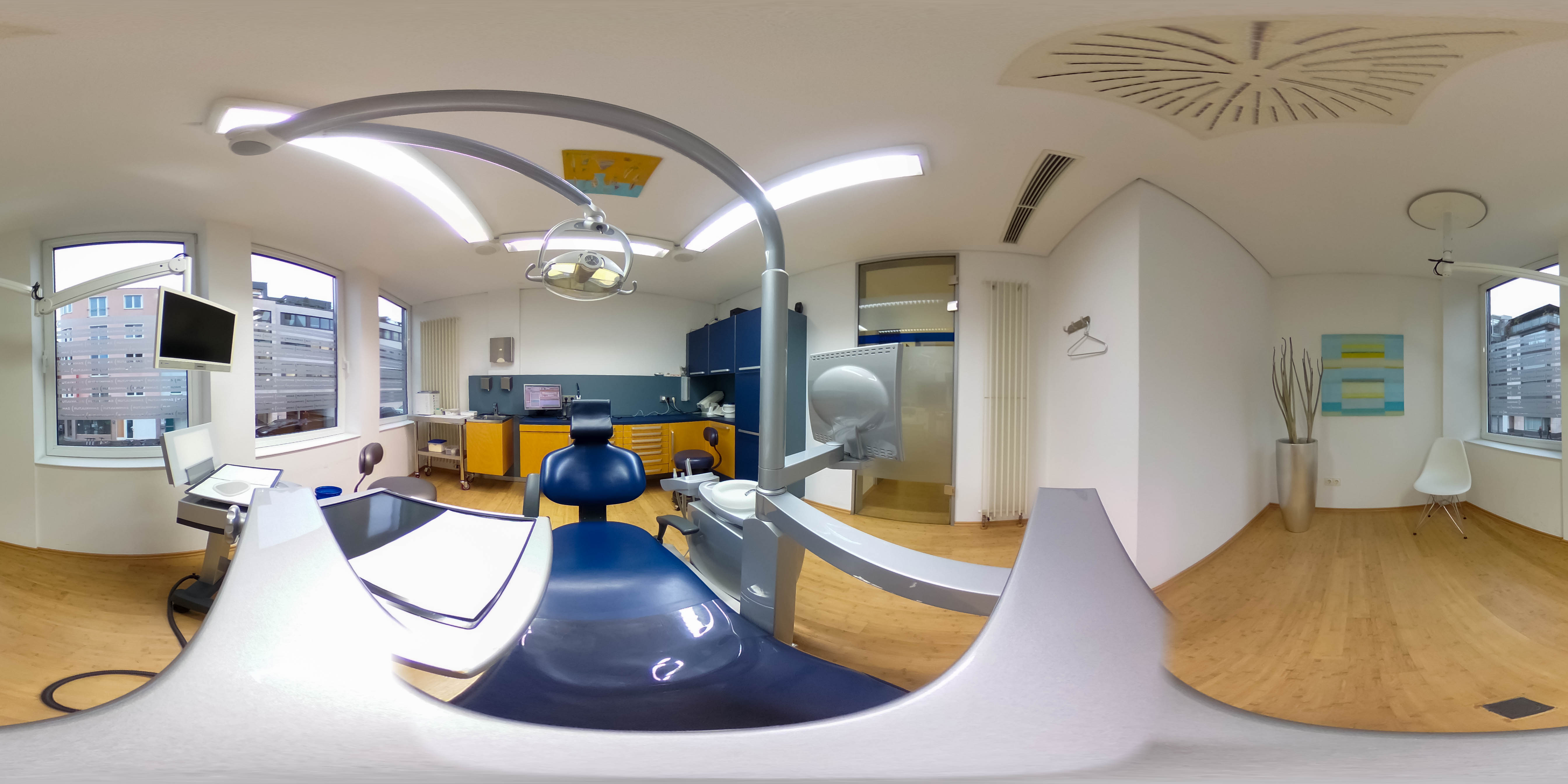
German dental practice in a spherical projection, 2019 (view as a 360° interactive panorama)

Pierre Fauchard of France is often referred to as the "father of modern dentistry" because in 1728, he was the first to publish a scientific textbook on the techniques and practices of dentistry. Over time, trained dentists immigrated from Europe to the Americas to practice dentistry, and by 1760, America had its own native born practicing dentists. Newspapers were used at the time to advertise and promote dental services. In America from 1768 to 1770, the first application of dentistry to verify forensic cases was being pioneered; this was called forensic dentistry. With the rise of dentists, there was also the rise of new methods to improve the quality of dentistry. These new methods included the spinning wheel to rotate a drill and chairs made specifically for dental patients.

In the 1840s, the world's first dental school and national dental organization were established. Along with the first dental school came the establishment of the Doctor of Dental Surgery degree, often referred to as a DDS degree. In response to the rise in new dentists as well as dentistry techniques, the first dental practice act was established to regulate dentistry. In the United States, the First Dental Practice Act required dentists to pass each specific state's medical board exam in order to practice dentistry in that particular state. However, because the Dental Act was rarely enforced, some dentists did not obey the act. From 1846 to 1855, new dental techniques were being invented, such as the use of ether anesthesia for surgery and the cohesive gold foil method, which enabled gold to be applied to a cavity. The American Dental Association was established in 1859 after a meeting with 26 dentists. Around 1867, the first university-associated dental school was established, Harvard Dental School. Lucy Hobbs Taylor was the first woman to earn a dental degree.

In the 1880s, tube toothpaste was invented, replacing the original forms of powder or liquid toothpaste. New dental boards, such as the National Association of Dental Examiners, were created to establish standards and uniformity among dentists. In 1887, the first dental laboratory was established; dental laboratories are used to create dentures and crowns that are specific to each patient. In 1895, the dental X-ray was discovered by a German physicist, Wilhelm Röntgen.

In the 20th century, new dental techniques and technology were invented such as the porcelain crowns (1903), Novocain (a local anesthetic) 1905, precision cast fillings (1907), nylon toothbrushes (1938), water fluoridation (1945), fluoride toothpaste (1950), air driven dental tools (1957), lasers (1960), electric toothbrushes (1960), and home tooth bleaching kits (1989) were invented. Inventions such as the air driven dental tools ushered in a new high-speed dentistry.

== Responsibilities ==
By nature of their general training, a licensed dentist can carry out most dental treatments such as restorative (dental restorations, crowns, bridges), orthodontics (braces), prosthodontic (dentures, crown/bridge), endodontic (root canal) therapy, periodontal (gum) therapy, and oral surgery (extraction of teeth), as well as performing examinations, taking radiographs (x-rays) and diagnosis. Additionally, dentists can further engage in oral surgery procedures such as dental implant placement. Dentists can also prescribe medications such as antibiotics, fluorides, pain killers, local anesthetics, sedatives/hypnotics and any other medications that serve in the treatment of the various conditions that arise in the head and neck.

All DDS and DMD degree holders are legally qualified to perform a number of more complex procedures such as gingival grafts, bone grafting, sinus lifts, and implants, as well as a range of more invasive oral and maxillofacial surgery procedures. However many choose to pursue residencies or other post-doctoral education to augment their abilities. A few select procedures, such as the administration of General anesthesia, legally require postdoctoral training in the US. While many oral diseases are unique and self-limiting, poor conditions in the oral cavity can lead to poor general health and vice versa; notably, there is a significant link between periodontal, cardiovascular, and endocrine diseases. Conditions in the oral cavity may also be indicative of other systemic diseases such as osteoporosis, diabetes, AIDS, and various blood diseases, including malignancies and lymphoma. Dentists can also prescribe medicines.

Several studies have suggested that dentists and dental students are at high risk of burnout. During burnout, dentists experience exhaustion, alienate from work and perform less efficiently. A systemic study identified risk factors associated with this condition such as practitioner's young age, personality type, gender, the status of education, high job strain, working hours, and the burden of clinical degrees requisites. The authors of this study concluded that intervention programs at an early stage during the undergraduate level may provide practitioners with a good strategy to prepare for and cope with this condition.

== Regulations ==
Depending on the country, all dentists are required to register with their national or local health board, regulators, and professional indemnity insurance in order to practice dentistry. In the UK, dentists are required to register with the General Dental Council. In Australia, it is the Dental Board of Australia, while in the United States, dentists are registered according to the individual state board. The main role of a dental regulator is to protect the public by ensuring only qualified dental practitioners are registered, handling any complaints or misconduct, and developing national guidelines and standards for dental practitioners to follow.

== List of specialties ==
For many countries, after satisfactory completion of post-graduate training, dental specialists are required to join a specialist board or list, in order to use the title 'specialist'.

=== United States ===
In the US, dental specialties are recognized by the American Dental Association (ADA) or the American Board of Dental Specialties (ABDS) Currently, the ADA lists twelve dental specialties, who are recognized by the National Commission on Recognition of Dental Specialties and Certifying Boards, while the ABDS recognizes four dental specialty boards.

List of Dental Specialties under the ADA:

- Dental anesthesiology – The study and administration of general anesthesia, sedation, local anesthesia, and advanced methods of pain control. Recognized by both ADA and ABDS.
- Dental public health – The study of dental epidemiology and social health policies.
- Endodontics – Root canal therapy and study of diseases of the dental pulp.
- Oral and maxillofacial pathology – The study, diagnosis, and sometimes the treatment of oral and maxillofacial-related diseases.
- Oral and maxillofacial radiology – The study and radiologic interpretation of oral and maxillofacial diseases.
- Oral and maxillofacial surgery – Extractions, implants, and maxillofacial surgery, which also includes correction of congenital facial deformities.
- Oral medicine - the discipline of dentistry concerned with the oral health care of medically complex patients – including the diagnosis and management of medical conditions that affect the oral and maxillofacial region. Recognized by both ADA and ABDS.
- Orofacial pain - the specialty of dentistry that encompasses the diagnosis, management, and treatment of pain disorders of the jaw, mouth, face, and associated regions. Recognized by both ADA and ABDS.
- Orthodontics and dentofacial orthopaedics – The straightening of teeth and modification of midface and mandibular growth.
- Periodontics – Study and treatment of diseases of the gums (non-surgical and surgical) as well as placement and maintenance of dental implants
- Pediatric dentistry (formerly pedodontics) – Dentistry for children. Teeth, bones, and jaw continually grow in children, and certain dental issues in children require specific attention.
- Prosthodontics – Dentures, bridges and dental implants (restoring/placing). Some prosthodontists further their training in "oral and maxillofacial prosthodontics", which is the discipline concerned with the replacement of missing facial structures, such as ears, eyes, noses, etc.

List of Dental Specialties under the ABDS:

- Oral implantology/implant dentistry
- Oral medicine
- Orofacial pain
- Dental anesthesiology

Specialists in these fields are designated "registrable" (in the United States, "board eligible") and warrant exclusive titles such as dentist, anesthesiologist, orthodontist, oral and maxillofacial surgeon, endodontist, pediatric dentist, periodontist, or prosthodontist upon satisfying certain local accreditation requirements (U.S., "Board Certified")

=== United Kingdom ===
In the UK, the specialties are recognized by the General Dental Council (GDC). Currently the GDC lists 13 different dental specialties:

- Dental & maxillofacial radiology – This specialty includes any medical imaging used to supplement investigations with relevant information about the anatomy, function, and health of the teeth, jaws, and surrounding structures.
- Dental public health – This is a non-clinical specialty that assesses the needs of dental health and explores the ways in which they can be met.
- Endodontics – This specialty includes the aetiology, diagnosis, treatment options, and prevention of disease that affects the nerve tissue found inside a tooth, roots, and surrounding tissues.
- Oral & Maxillofacial pathology – This is a clinical specialty that is undertaken by laboratory-based personnel. It assesses the changes in the tissues of the oral cavity, jaws, and salivary glands that are characteristic of disease to aid in coming to a diagnosis.
- Restorative dentistry – This is based on three monospecialities. These are endodontics, periodontics and prosthodontics. Periodontists are dentists that specialize in preventing, diagnosing, and treating gum disease. Prosthodontists deal with missing teeth.
- Oral medicine – This specialty deals with the diagnosis and non-surgical management of patients with disorders related to the oral and maxillofacial region.
- Oral Microbiology – This clinical specialty involves diagnosing, reporting, and interpreting microbiological samples taken from mouth
- Oral Surgery – This clinical specialty manages any abnormalities of the jaw and mouth that requires surgery
- Orthodontics – This clinical specialty deals with correcting the irregularities of the teeth, jaw, and bite
- Paediatric dentistry – This clinical specialty provides comprehensive oral health care for children from infants to adolescents including children with mental or physical impairments
- Periodontics – This clinical specialty is involved in the diagnosis and treatment of gums
- Prosthodontics – This clinical specialty deals with replacing missing teeth by using fixed or removable prosthesis such as implants, bridges, dentures
- Special needs dentistry – This clinical specialty is trained to improve and manage the oral health of adults with disability in physical, mental, medical, social, emotional, and learning impairments

=== European Union ===
European Union legislation recognizes two dental specialties: Oral and Maxillofacial Surgery (A degree in dentistry and medicine being compulsory in some countries such as Germany) and Orthodontics.

== See also ==
- Dental hygienist
- Dental technician
- Dental therapist
- Dental assistant
- Occupational hazards in dentistry
