= Dental school =

Educational institution teaching dentistry

A dental school (school of dental medicine, school of dentistry, dental college) is a tertiary educational institution—or part of such an institution—that teaches dental medicine to prospective dentists and potentially other dental auxiliaries. Dental school graduates receive a degree in Dentistry, Dental Surgery, or Dental Medicine, which, depending upon the jurisdiction, might be a bachelor's degree, master's degree, a professional degree, or a doctorate. Schools can also offer postgraduate training in general dentistry, and/or training in endodontics, oral and maxillofacial surgery, oral pathology, oral and maxillofacial radiology, orthodontics, pedodontics, periodontics, prosthodontics, dental public health, restorative dentistry, as well as postgraduate training for dental hygienists and dental technicians.

Other oral health professionals including dental hygienists, dental technicians and denturists, dental therapists and oral health therapists, Dental assistants or dental nurses, and other members of the dental auxiliary including orthodontic auxiliaries may be trained at dental schools, or at universities of applied science or polytechnics.

Sometimes dental education is done within medical schools, as in Pakistan; the separation between medical and dental educations is also blurred within certain sub-specialties, such as oral and maxillofacial surgery.

High enrollment in dental schools occurred during the 1980–81 academic year, when there were approximately 23,000 students enrolled in U.S. dental schools. In the mid-1980s, enrollment began to decline. Several dental schools have closed and the number of new dentists has dwindled for some time. As of March 2010, there were more than 19,000 students per year enrolled in dental schools training dentists.

== Conditions of enrollment ==
Before applying to dental school, you must have completed an undergraduate degree in science disciplines such as biology, chemistry, and physics. This knowledge is necessary to understand the complex nature of dental procedures and treatments. In addition, some dental schools may have prerequisite courses required.

The Dental Admission Test (DAT) is a standardized exam that assesses the academic ability and scientific knowledge of applicants to dental schools. Applicants must score high enough on the DAT exam to get into dental school. The exam consists of multiple-choice questions on a variety of subjects including biology, general chemistry, organic chemistry, reading comprehension, and quantitative reasoning.

== List of dental schools ==
- List of dental schools in Australia
- List of dental schools in Bangladesh
- List of dental schools in Canada
- List of dental colleges in India
- List of dental schools in Israel
- List of dental schools in Pakistan
- List of dental schools in the United Kingdom
- List of dental schools in the United States
- List of dental colleges in South Korea

== See also ==
- Dentistry throughout the world
- Dental degree
- American Student Dental Association
