= Dental nurse =

Dental nurse may refer to:

- Dental auxiliary
- Dental assistant
- Registered dental nurse in the United Kingdom
