= Dental prosthetist =

Dental prosthetist may refer to:

- Dental technician, a person who makes dentures
- Denturist or clinical dental technician, a person who makes dentures and fits them to patients
- Prosthodontist, a certified Dental Specialist (Dentist with additional training in removable prostheses ("dentures") and oral rehabilitations)
