= Inez Pruitt =

Physician assistant from Virginia

Elizabeth Inez Parks Pruitt (born 1962) is a physician assistant from Virginia. She was named one of the Virginia Women in History for 2013.

Pruitt, a native of Tangier Island in the Chesapeake Bay who can trace her lineage back several generations in the community, dropped out of high school in her youth. She was early intrigued by the medical profession when a doctor, visiting the island from the Eastern Shore, stayed with her family. In 1984 she became a dental assistant, and in 1987 began working with David Nichols, the long-time primary care physician who would visit the island weekly. In 2001 she entered the physician assistant program at the University of Maryland Eastern Shore, commuting daily by boat at first; eventually she moved to the mainland to complete her degree, which she received in 2006. Upon the death of Dr. Nichols in 2010 Pruitt became the primary health care provider for the community, where she runs the state-of-the-art health center whose construction Nichols spearheaded and which opened four months before his death. Pruitt is married and has two daughters, Anna and Irene, with her husband Jerry.
