= Denturist =

Healthcare occupation caring for the mouth and teeth

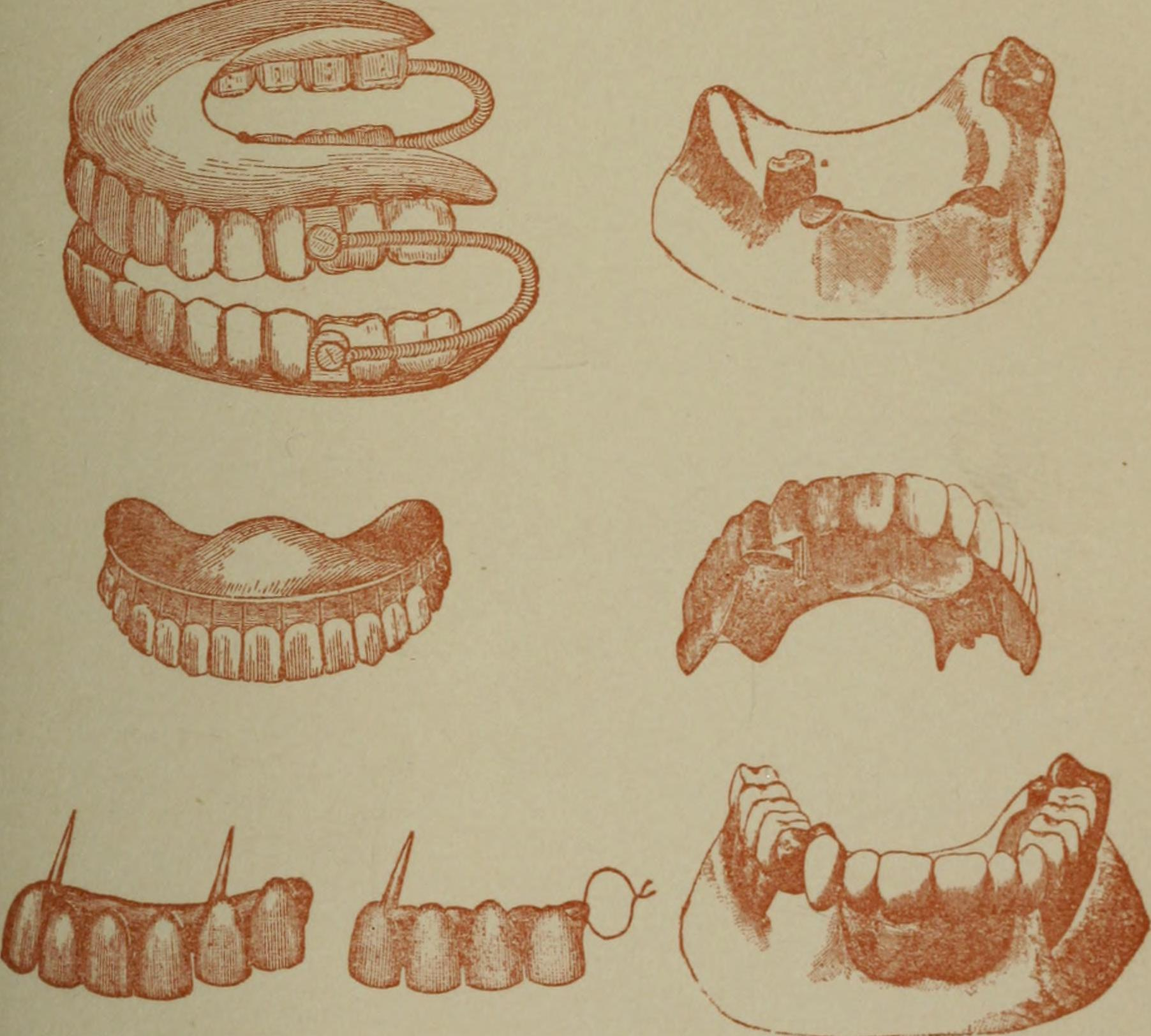
- Examples of different types of intraoral prostheses.

Occupation
- Names: Denturist (United States and Canada); Dental Prosthetist (Australia and New Zealand); Clinical Dental Technologist (United Kingdom)

Description
- Education required: Diploma, Advanced diploma, bachelor's degree, or master's degree
- Fields of employment: Dental
- Related jobs: Dentist, dental hygienist, dental therapist, prosthetist

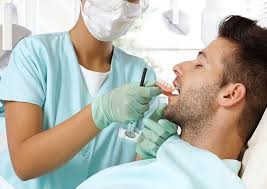
Denturist performs denture delivery procedure intraorally.

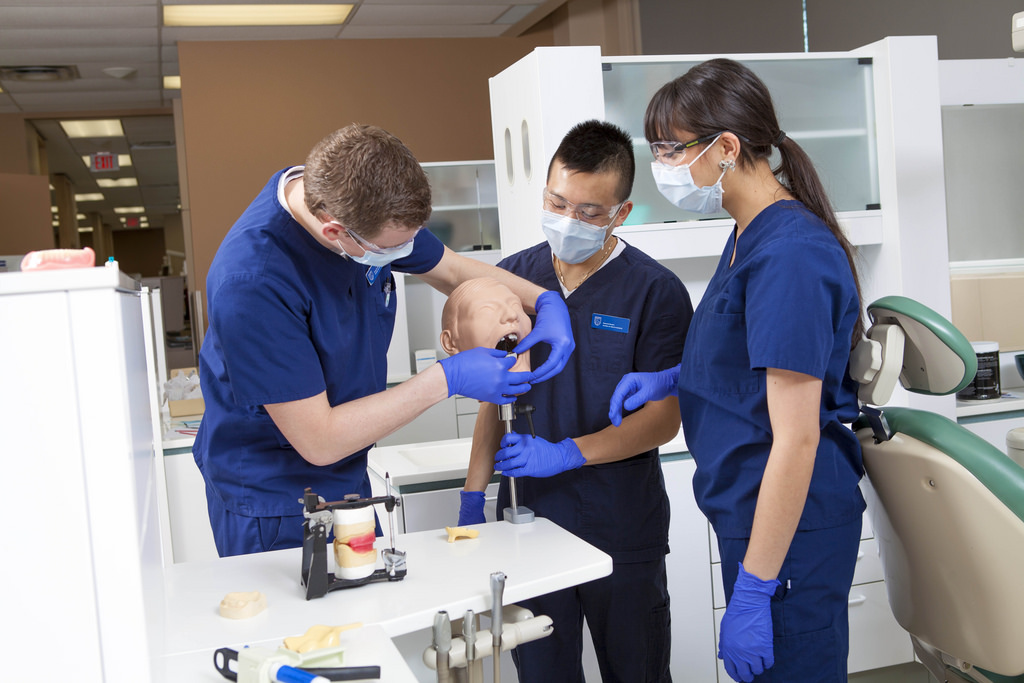
Denturist students at NAIT work on simulation of denture intraoral procedures in their classroom.

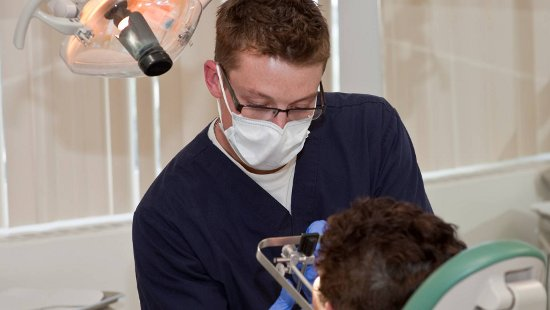
NAIT student working with facebow for patient jaw relation recording

A denturist in the United States and Canada, clinical dental technologist in the United Kingdom and Ireland, dental prosthetist in Australia, or a clinical dental technician in New Zealand is a member of the oral health care team and role as primary oral health care provider who provides an oral health examination, planning treatment, takes impressions of the surrounding oral tissues, constructs and delivers removable oral prosthesis treatment (including dentures and partial dentures) directly to the patient.

== Definitions ==
Denturism is defined as the practice by denturists of examining oral health, planning treatment, making artificial dentures including other removable oral appliances and fitting them to patients. It is a recognized profession throughout the world and currently utilized in many countries including Australia, New Zealand, United States, United Kingdom and Canada.

In the United States, denturism is only legislated and practiced in 7 states (Maine, Arizona, Idaho, Montana, Washington, Oregon, and Colorado). However, in Australia, the United Kingdom and Canada, all states, provinces and territories recognize the profession.

The criteria and training to become a denturist vary by country and region; however, after completion of required prerequisites which are completion of a dental technology program or several years of experience in denturitry with completion of core required courses, generally the denturism programs take 3–5 years and the qualification ranges from a Diploma to a master's degree. Due to the diversity in training, the scope of practice for a denturist can vary among countries; however, the general principle remains the same.

Denturist curriculum contains courses such as, General biology, Microbiology, Human anatomy, Head and Neck anatomy, Dental anatomy, Physiology, Dental Materials, Dental technology theory, Infection prevention and control, Radiographic interpretation, Periodontology, Histology, Embryology, Nutrition, Psychology, Pathophysiology, Oral pathology, Pharmacology, Gerontology, Ethics, Removable and Fixed prosthetics, Implantology, Removable oral appliances, Clinical & Laboratory theory, Practice management, etc.

The program is competitive and selective. Completing a Dental Technology Degree prior to entering Denture Specialist Program is a common academic path. By acquiring Dental Technology knowledge prior to entering Denture Specialist Program provides foundational knowledge for the advanced curriculum. Work experience from denturist clinic or denture laboratory is considered advantageous for program completion and career progression.

=== Role in the dental team ===
Denturists are an important part of the dental team. They often work alongside general dentists, dental specialists and other members of a dental team in both private and public sectors of the oral health workforce. They can also work independently in their own clinic with patients providing appropriate management and treatment of dentures and other oral appliances. Denturists are well educated in clinical and technical knowledge of denture care, as well as completing many hours of practical skills in producing dentures.

They ultimately receive more comprehensive study in oral prosthetics than any other health professional including the general dentist since dental schools less emphasis in their curriculum about removable prosthetics and focus on implantology in contrast denturist schools teaches mainstream of removable prosthetics and dentures and spend several years for training. Therefore, the collaborative role of denturists provides an important model of re-allocating dental services to alleviate stresses from the general dentists, reserving time for restorative, cosmetic, hygiene, and emergency dental procedures.

Denturists differ from both dental technicians and prosthodontists. Dental technicians are registered members of the dental team who support dental practitioners in the delivery of dental services. Prosthodontists are qualified dentists, who have specialized in making fixed or removable appliances for patients.

== History of denturism ==
=== Dentures throughout the ages ===
The use of "false teeth" has prevailed throughout the course of history. Archaeological evidence dating back to 1500 B.C. was found in Egypt. The Egyptians would use real teeth threaded with a gold wire to create a false set of teeth. In northern Italy 700 B.C., the Etruscans made dentures out of animal teeth. Hence the world of dental prosthodontics began to take shape. Despite being made of low quality material and having short life spans, dentures were relatively popular.

The first complete set of dentures is attributed to 16th century Japan. They were known as the Japanese box and are quite similar in shape to modern day dentures.

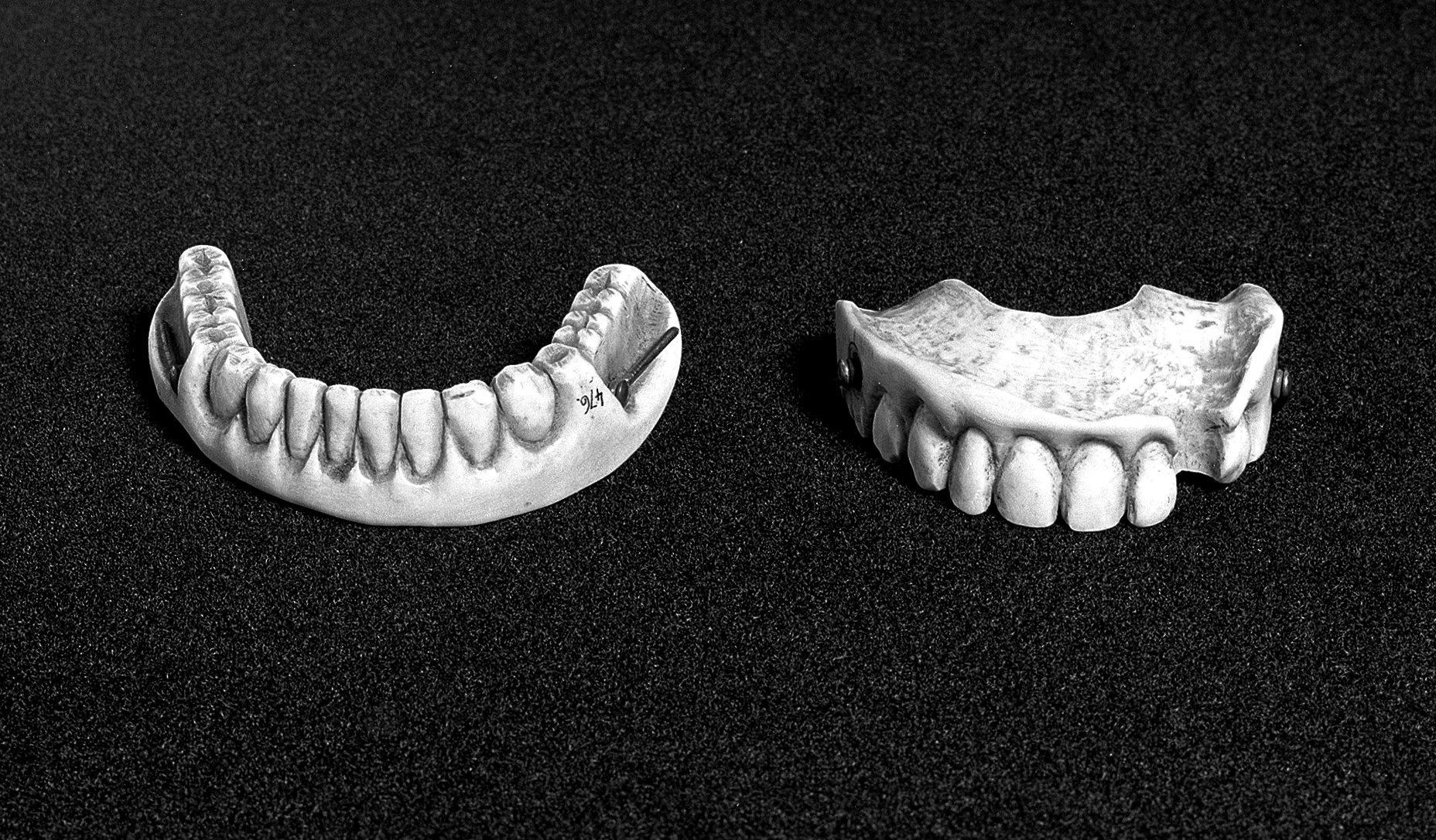
Carved ivory upper and lower dentures (18th century)

In the 1700s, ivory dentures were developed from walrus, elephant or hippopotamus tusks. Alexis Duchateu crafted the first porcelain dentures in 1770. These were prone to cracking and appeared too white to be natural teeth. Duchateus was a pharmacist, since Denturist, as an occupation was yet to be established.

In the 1800s, the incidence of dental decay and tooth loss began to increase rapidly. The industrialisation period meant the consumption of sugar among British citizens increased by 500 percent. A need for an alternative form of dentures was needed.

In 1815, the Battle of Waterloo gave rise to the highly demanded "Waterloo teeth". These were dentures crafted primarily from the teeth of dead soldiers seated in a base of animal ivory. Waterloo dentures gave the appearance of natural teeth and were not as prone to breakage as porcelain dentures.

In 1820, Claudius Ash was given the task of crafting a new and improved form of dentures. Ash was a silversmith and goldsmith. He constructed porcelain on 18-karat gold plates. The springs that held the dentures together were also made of gold. Dentures that were previously made from natural teeth or porcelain were both aesthetically and functionally inferior in comparison to Ash's design.

In the 1850s, Ash and his company developed Vulcanite (hardened rubber that seated porcelain teeth). His company was the leading supplier of this form of dentures in Europe. Charles Goodyear was awarded the patent for Vulcanite-based dentures in 1851. Dentures, at the time, were primarily focused on aesthetics. Early in the 20th century, Dentistry shifted from treatment based therapy to prevention and as such, dentures that were in line with good health became more favourable. Having a clear occupation for dentures alone became a requirement.

=== Legal recognition of denturists ===
The 1919 Tasmanian Dental Act made a clear distinction between the role of a Dentist and the practice of denture making. For a patient that required dentures, a consultation by referral from a Dentist became normal procedure. Denturism – that is the field of dentures - was not recognised until more recent times. The Health Amendment Act (1933) was the first legal document that gave rise to the practice of Denturism in Canada. The Dental Mechanics Act of Alberta (1961) was the future update to this legislation allowing Denturists to begin work in the field. They were also known as "Dental Mechanics" or "Denture Therapists." This gave rise for the need for legal recognition of denturists in other countries. In the United States, the first legally recognised Denturists were found in Oregon, 1971. In 1974, denturists were first legally recognised and in 1978, Denture Therapists began practicing.

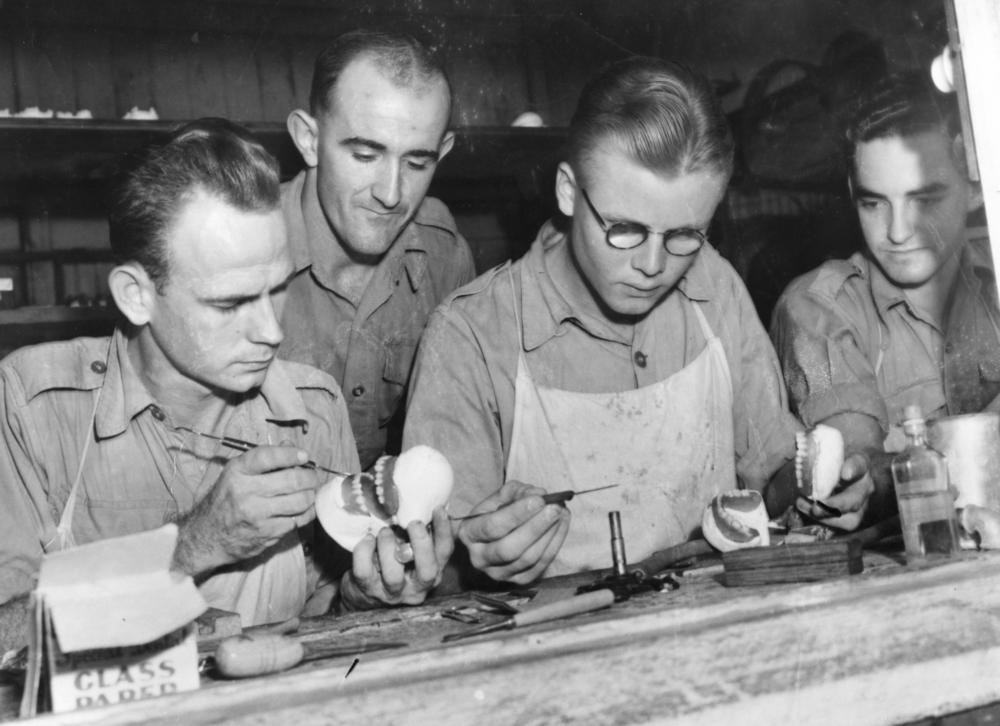
Demonstration of denture construction, Brisbane, 1940

The increasing rate of ill-fitting, misaligned, unstable and unsupportive dentures motivated three Denturists in 1956 to pursue international recognition. Rolf Pfenniger, Hannes Stiebler and Stephan Grabert formed the Internationale Arbeitsgemeinschaft der Zahnprothetiker. In English, this is the International Federation of Denturists.

Denturists have campaigned for the right to practice independently in many states, with the argument that they can provide greater access and lower-cost prosthetic services. This argument has been disproved by examining other jurisdictions in the world which have both dentists and denturists. In Canada, six years after regulating of denturists commenced, the fees quoted in their fee guide were similar to those of dentists. Consequently, most of these campaigns have so far failed.

In some jurisdictions, denturists must operate under the supervision or oral health certificate of a dentist. Many dentists argue that this does not happen. For example, in 1991, investigators hired by the Arizona Dental Association found that only three out of the state's 13 denturists advised callers to see a dentist before visiting them. Many denturists argue that from a business point of view dentists are viewed as competition and in many locations dentists may "steal their business" after doing an exam. With the work of the IFD and other denturist campaigns across the globe, there is hope for clearer recognition and scope in future.

== Training in different countries ==
=== Australia ===
The following programs of study have currently been approved by the Dental Board of Australia for the profession of dental prosthetics. On successful completion of the selected courses, individuals are required to register with the Australian Health Practitioner Regulation Agency to practice legally as a dental prosthetist.

Australia
| Education Provider | Qualification | Course Type | Course Length (Years) |
|---|---|---|---|
| Griffith University | Bachelor of Dental Prosthetics (undergraduate entry) | Bachelor's Degree | 3 |
| Griffith University | Graduate Diploma of Dental Technology in Prosthetics (post-graduate entry only) | Graduate Diploma | 1 |
| Griffith University | Master of Dental Technology in Prosthetics (post-graduate entry only) | Master's Degree | 1.5 |
| Griffith University | Master of Dental Technology in Prosthetics/Graduate Diploma of Dental Technology in Prosthetics (exit point only) (post-graduate entry only) | Master's Degree | 1/1.5 |
| RMIT University | Advanced Diploma of Dental Prosthetics (undergraduate entry) | Advanced Diploma | 2 |
| TAFE New South Wales Sydney Institute | Advanced Diploma of Dental Prosthetics (undergraduate entry) | Advanced Diploma | 2 |
| TAFE South Australia | Advanced Diploma of Dental Prosthetics (undergraduate entry) | Advanced Diploma | 2 |
| TAFE Queensland | Bachelor of Dental Prosthetics (undergraduate entry) | Bachelor's Degree | 3 |

=== Canada ===
The following programs of study have currently been approved by the Denturist Association of Canada for the profession of denturism. On successful completion of the selected courses, individuals are then required to complete a Qualifying Examination administered by the College of Denturists, consisting of two components: a written examination and a structured clinical examination. Upon successful completion of the examination, individuals may then register with the College of Denturists of Ontario to practice legally as a denturist.

Canada
| Education Provider | Qualification | Course Type | Course Length (Years) |
|---|---|---|---|
| CDI College | Advanced Diploma of Dental Technology | Advanced Diploma | 3 |
| College Edouard-Montpetit | College Diploma of Techniques of Denturology | Advanced Diploma | 3 |
| George Brown College | Ontario College Advanced Diploma (Denturism) | Advanced Diploma | 3 |
| Georgian College | Ontario College Advanced Diploma (Denturism) | Advanced Diploma | 3 |
| Northern Alberta Institute of Technology | Diploma of Dental Technology | Advanced Diploma | 3 |
| Oxford College of Arts, Business and Technology | Ontario College Advanced Diploma (Denturism) | Advanced Diploma | 3 |

=== United States ===
In the United States, there are certain prerequisites that need to be completed before individuals can apply at either of the two programs of study approved by the National Denturist Association USA. The prerequisites vary from prior work experience to related education in the dental field.
On successful completion of the selected courses, individuals are then required to complete a jurisdiction, written and clinical examination offered by each legislated state. Upon successful completion of the examination, individuals can register with each legislated state and the National Denturist Association USA to practice legally as a denturist.

United States
| Education Provider | Qualification | Course Type | Course Length (Years) |
|---|---|---|---|
| American Denturist College | Denturist | Diploma, Bachelor's degree | 3~4 |

=== United Kingdom ===
The following programs of study have currently been approved by the General Dental Council for the profession of clinical dental technologist. Required prerequisites must be completed prior to enter Clinical Dental Technology Program. On successful completion of the selected courses, individuals are required to register with the General Dental Council to practice legally as a clinical dental technologist.

United Kingdom
| Education Provider | Qualification | Course Type | Course Length (Years) |
|---|---|---|---|
| Edinburgh Postgraduate Dental Institute | Clinical Dental Technology | BSc | 3 |
| Kent, Surrey and Sussex Postgraduate Dentistry | Clinical Dental Technology | BSc | 3 |
| University of Central Lancashire | Clinical Dental Technology | BSc | 3 |

== Scope of practice in different countries ==
The scope of practice differs in each country, based on the training undertaken.

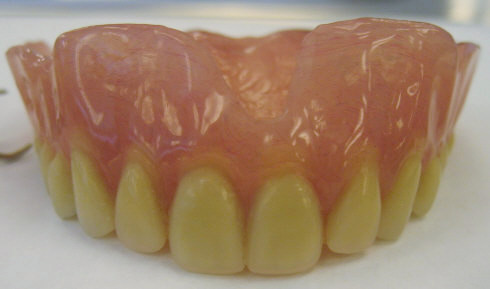
Full upper denture

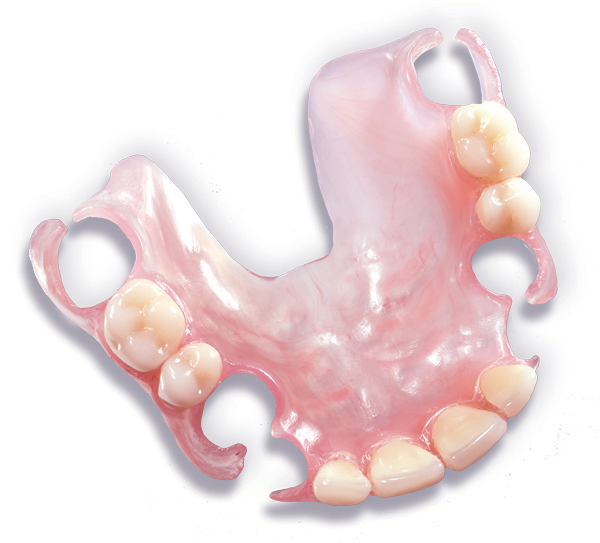
Partial denture

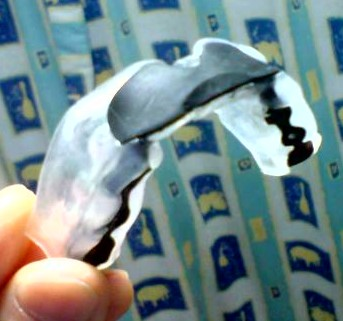
Mouthguard

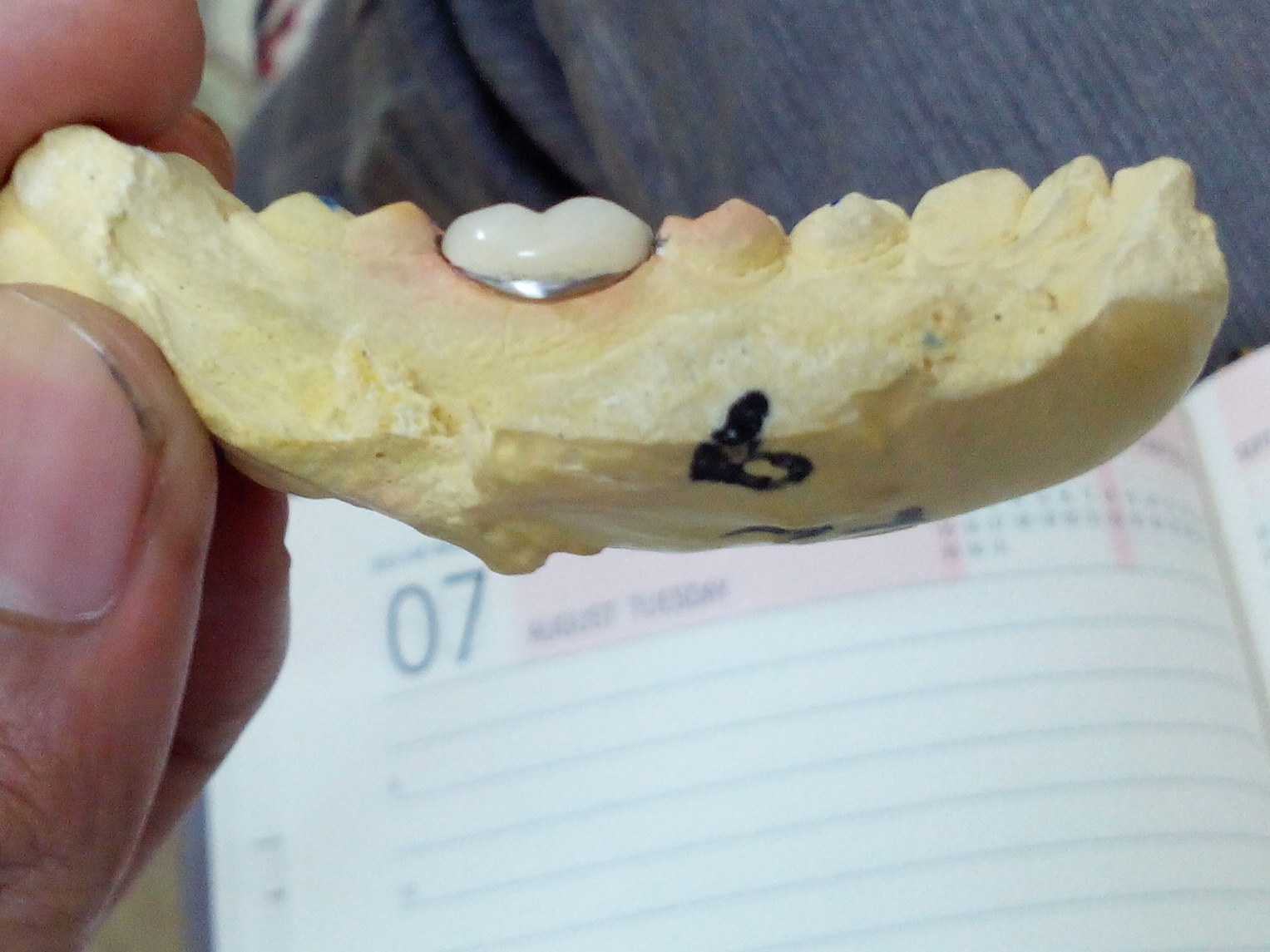
Dental crown made using the patient's impression

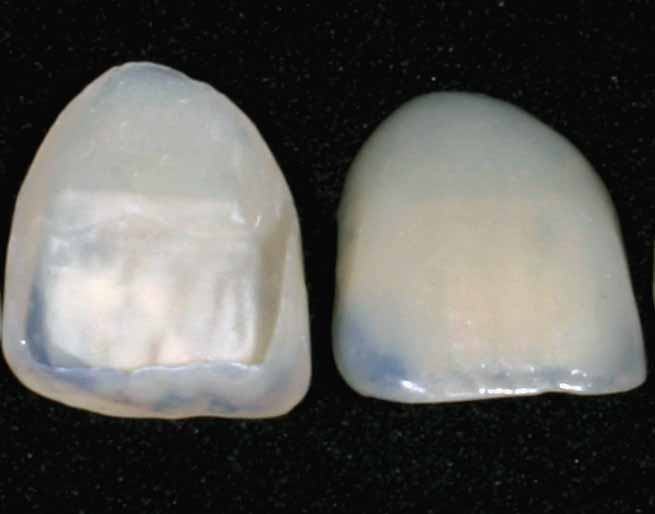
Dental veneers

=== Australia ===
The following scope of practice has been outlined by the Australian Dental Association for registered dental prosthetists.

Dental prosthetists in Australia can:

- perform both visual and digital oral health examinations.
- prescribe oral prosthetics to dental technicians.
- prescribe radiography.
- Supervise auxiliary personnel in the performance of their delegated duties.
- Create impressions of peoples' teeth, in order to make customized partial or complete dentures and mouthguards.
- Refer patients with more complex issues to a dentist or specialist dentist when appropriate.
- Treat bruxism and sleep apnea by using night guard and anti snoring device.
- Treat teeth whitening by using custom bleach tray.
- Maintain and repair existing dental prostheses.
- Educate patients on oral health hygiene techniques.

=== United States ===
The following scope of practice has been outlined by the National Denturist Association for registered denturists.
Denturists in the United States can:

- Perform both visual and digital oral health examinations.
- Obtain medical and dental history.
- prescribe oral prosthetics to dental technicians.
- prescribe radiography.
- planning treatment, design and fit full dentures including implant retained dentures for patients who are missing all of their teeth.
- Planning treatment, design and fit removable partial dentures including implant retained dentures for patients who are missing only one or a few teeth.
- Treat bruxism and sleep apnea by using night guard and anti snoring device.
- Treat teeth whitening by using custom bleach tray.
- Educate patients on oral health hygiene techniques.
- Supervise auxiliary personnel in the performance of their delegated duties.
- replacing implant abutment for Oral appliances.

=== United Kingdom ===
The following scope of practice has been outlined by the General Dental council for registered clinical dental technologist.
Clinical dental technologist in the United Kingdom can:

- perform both visual and digital oral health examinations.
- treatment by using removable oral appliances directly to patient
- prescribe oral prosthetics to dental technicians.
- Provide and fit other dental devices (including mouthguards).
- Supervise auxiliary personnel in the performance of their delegated duties.
- Take a detailed medical and dental history.
- Perform technical and clinical procedures related to providing removable dental appliances.
- Carry out clinical examinations within their scope of practice to examine for details such as space and retention.
- Take and process radiographs and other images related to providing removable dental appliances.
- Distinguish between normal and abnormal consequences of ageing.
- Give appropriate patient advice.
- Recognize abnormal oral mucosal lesions and related underlying structures and refer patients to other healthcare professionals if necessary.
- Vary the detail but not the direction of a prescription according to patient needs.

Additional skills which CDTs in the UK could develop include:

- Providing oral health education.
- Re-cementing crowns with temporary cement.
- Providing anti-snoring devices.
- Removing sutures after the wound has been checked by a dentist.
- Prescribing radiographs.
- Replacing implant abutments for dental appliances.
- Providing tooth whitening treatments.

=== Canada ===
The following scope of practice has been outlined by the Denturist Association of Canada for registered denturists.
Denturists in Canada can:

- perform both visual and digital oral health examinations.
- Provide removable oral appliances directly to a patient.
- Perform a complete visual/digital oral examination and evaluation of the patient. This includes obtaining a complete medical and dental history of the patient.
- Treat bruxism and sleep apnea by using night guard and anti snoring device.
- Treat teeth whitening by using custom bleach tray.
- prescribe radiography.
- prescribe oral prosthetics to dental technicians.
- Take impressions and make necessary jaw relation records
- Select the artificial teeth and designs the dentures.
- Fabricate and insert the dentures in the mouths of patients.
- Perform any adjunctive services such as repairs, relines or adjustments of removable dentures.
- Supervise auxiliary personnel in the performance of their delegated duties.

== See also ==
- Dentistry
- Dentures
- Dentist
- Dental auxiliary
  - Dental assistant
  - Dental therapist
  - Dental hygienist
  - Dental technician
- Prosthetist (non-dental)
