= British Association of Dental Nurses =

Organisation for dental nurses across UK

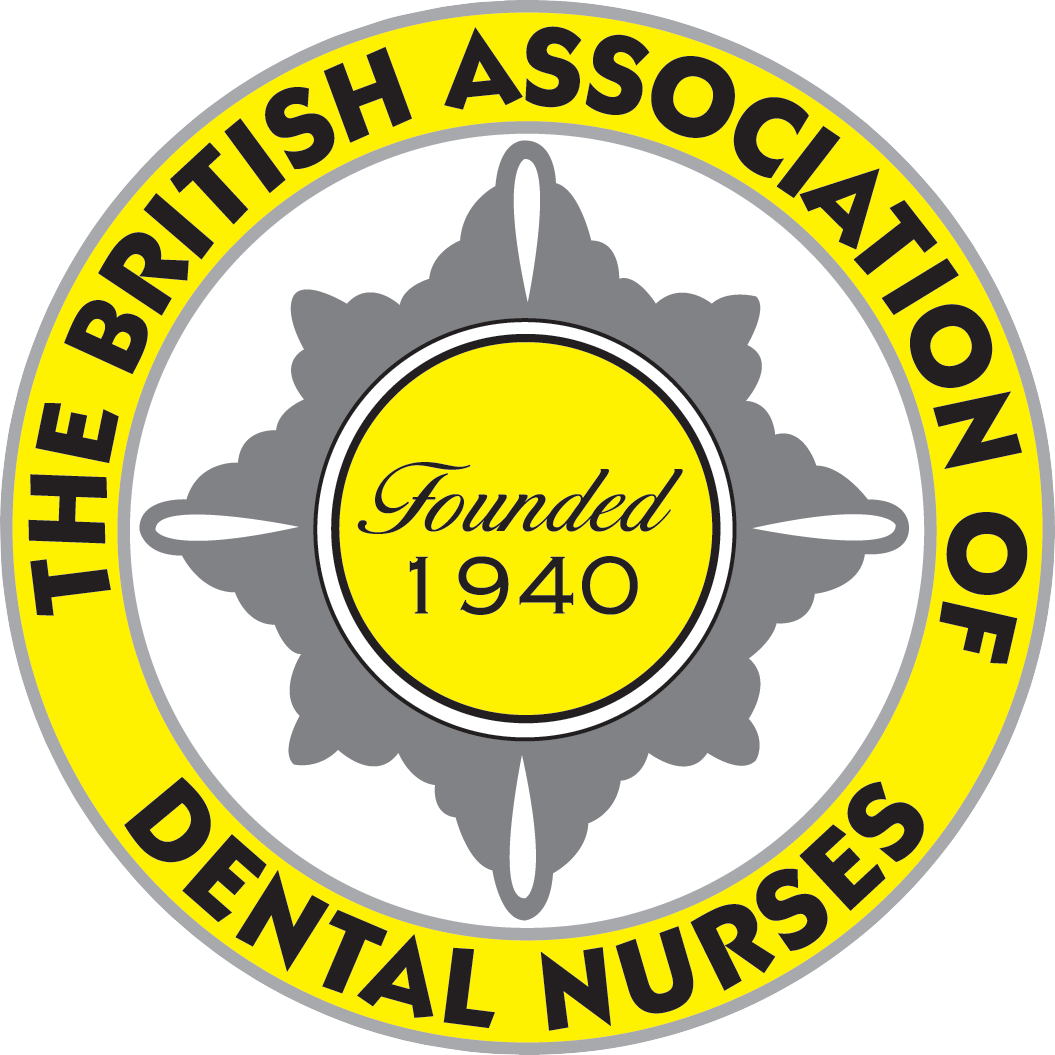
- Formation: 1940; 86 years ago
- Headquarters: Fleetwood
- Location: United Kingdom
- Members: ▼4,585 (2024)
- President: Preetee Hylton
- Chairman: Ruth Garrity
- Website: badn.org.uk

The British Association of Dental Nurses (BADN) is an organisation that represents dental nurses across the UK, headquartered in Lancashire, and is an independent trade union.

== History ==
It was formed in October 1940 in Leyland, Lancashire. It was originally called the British Dental Nurses and Assistants Society. On 1 November 1994 the name became the British Association of Dental Nurses.

In 1976, due to legislation of the Trade Union and Labour Relations Act 1974, to support dental nurses it had to become a trade union, the Association of British Dental Surgery Assistants.

Since 2008, all dental nurses working in the UK have to be registered with the General Dental Council (www.gdc-uk.org)

=== Journal ===
Since the mid-1940s, it has produced a Journal, the British Dental Surgery Assistant. In 1994 this became British Dental Nurses' Journal (BDNJ).

== Structure ==
The Association's offices are situated at 13-15 Preston Street, Fleetwood, FY7 6JA
