= List of dental colleges in South Korea =

This list of dental colleges in South Korea include all 10 colleges of Dentistry and 3 dentistry graduate schools in South Korea which are established for dentist training. They are recognised by the D.D.S. and a dental degree from a South Korean university. There are 8 colleges in Seoul; 1 college at Gangwon Province, 1 at South Chungcheong Province, 2 at Gwangju, 2 at North Jeolla Province, 1 at South Gyeongsang Province and 1 in Deagu.

== Seoul ==
Name	University	Established	Comments	ref.
College of Dentistry	Kyung Hee University	1967	Since 2017, Turn Dentistry graduate school over to college of dentistry	
School of Dentistry	Seoul National University	1962	College of dentistry was replaced at 2002. Since 2014, SNU recruits students for bachelor's degree-ㅡmaster degree integrated course	
College of Dentistry	Yonsei University	1968	Since 2015, Turn Dentistry graduate school over to college of dentistry	

== Gangwon Province ==
Name	University	Established	Comments	ref.
College of Dentistry	Gangneung-Wonju National University	1992		

== South Chungcheong Province ==
Name	University	Established	Comments	ref.
College of Dentistry	Dankook University	1979		

== Gwangju ==
Name	University	Established	Comments	ref.
School of Dentistry	Chonnam National University	1981	2005, established school of dentistry	
College of Dentistry	Chosun University	1973	Since 2017, Turn Dentistry graduate school over to college of dentistry	

== North Jeolla Province ==
Name	University	Established	Comments	ref.
Graduate School of Dentistry	Chonbuk National University	1978		
College of Dentistry	Wonkwang University	1978		

== South Gyeongsang Province ==
Name	University	Established	Comments	ref.
School of Dentistry	1979	Pusan National University		

== Daegu ==
Name	University	Established	Comments	ref.
College of Dentistry	1973	Kyungpook National University	Since 2017, Turn Dentistry graduate school over to college of dentistry	

== See also ==
- List of universities and colleges in South Korea
