= Arizona Dental Association =

Constituent society of the ADA

The Arizona Dental Association (AzDA) is a constituent society of the American Dental Association that encourages improvements in public oral health and promotes the art and science of dentistry through leadership, education and information. AzDA was established in 1909 as a nonprofit professional membership organization currently representing over 2500 members, which is approximately 80% of all licensed dentists in Arizona. AzDA also manages three local component organizations, Central Arizona Dental Society (CADS), Northern Arizona Dental Society (NADS) and Southern Arizona Dental Society (SADS).

The Arizona Dental Foundation (ADF) is the charitable outreach program of AzDA. ADF provides dental education, along with managing annual charitable events like "Give Kids a Smile", "Donated Dental Services", "Hope Fest”, "Hispanic Health Fair", "Special Olympics – Special Smiles" within the state Arizona.

The Western Regional Dental Convention is sponsored by AzDA and held annually in Phoenix for the purpose of providing continuing education credits required for licensure and opportunities for dentists, dental hygienists, dental assistants, dental business professionals, dental laboratory professionals and other members of the dental community to network. The 300-booth professional trade show contains a lavish display of the latest products, services and technological innovations dental professionals use every day.

In January 2025, when asked for comment, the organization warned about the possible removal of fluoride in drinking water, a policy promoted by president-elect Donald Trump's choice for Health and Human Services secretary, Robert F. Kennedy Jr.
