= List of dental schools in Australia =

This list of dental schools includes major academic institutions in Australia that award advanced professional degrees in the field of dentistry. Dental degrees offered in Australia include bachelor's degrees, master's by coursework and extended master's degrees.

== Table ==
University	Location	Entry	Duration	Degree(s)
Charles Sturt University	Orange	Undergraduate	5 years	BDentSc
James Cook University	Cairns	Undergraduate	5 years	BDS
Griffith University	Gold Coast	Undergraduate	5 years	BDHSc/MDent
La Trobe University	Bendigo	Undergraduate	5 years	BDSc (Hons)
University of Adelaide	Adelaide	Undergraduate	5 years	BDS
University of Melbourne	Melbourne	Graduate	4 years	DDS
University of Queensland	Brisbane	Undergraduate /Graduate	5 years 3.5 years	BDSc (Hons)/ DMD
University of Sydney	Sydney	Undergraduate; Graduate	7 years 4 years	BSc/DMD; DMD
University of Western Australia	Perth	Graduate	4 years	DMD

== See also ==
- Royal Australasian College of Dental Surgeons
