= Oxford College of Arts, Business and Technology =

Coordinates: 43.7771°N 79.2499°W

Oxford College of Arts, Business and Technology campus

Oxford College of Arts, Business and Technology is a registered private career college licensed by the Ontario Ministry of Training, Colleges and Universities, located in Toronto, Ontario, Canada. Oxford College was founded in 2003, and offers diplomas related to the dental hygiene, clinical research and other medical and pharmaceutical occupations including Medical Laboratory Assistant and Technician Diploma, and Pharmaceutical Manufacturing Technology etc. .

In 2010, Matilda Berg was named the new Director of the Dental Hygiene program

== Accreditation ==
The college operates under the jurisdiction of the Ontario Private Career Colleges Act (2005) and is registered with the Ontario Ministry of Training, Colleges and Universities. The Dental Hygiene program is accredited by the Commission on Dental Accreditation of Canada., while Medical Laboratory Assistant and Technicians Diploma Program is an Ontario Society of Medical Technologist (OSMT) recognized Diploma program.
