= Dental auxiliary =

Health professions allied to dentistry

A dental auxiliary is any oral health practitioner other than a dentist & dental hygienist, including the supporting team assisting in dental treatment. They include dental assistants (known as dental nurses in the United Kingdom and Ireland), dental therapists and oral health therapists, dental technologists, and orthodontic auxiliaries. The role of dental auxiliaries is usually set out in regional dental regulations, defining the treatment that can be performed.

== Dental assistants ==
Dental assistant help make dental treatment more efficient by assisting the clinician. They hold and pass instruments, retract tissues and apply suction to assist better vision of the operating field. They also mix materials, help maintain dental records, and sterilize instruments and equipment. Some also engage in professional teeth whitening procedures, particularly in The Republic of Ireland where laser teeth whitening is classified as a cosmetic procedure and not dental treatment. This practice usually occurs in clinics solely devoted to laser teeth whitening and not routine dental treatment.

== Dental therapists ==
Dental therapists are licensed dental auxiliaries in some countries. Therapists were created in New Zealand in 1921, with the formation of the School Dental Service, and spread mainly to other Commonwealth countries. Local regulations determine the duties therapists are allowed to perform, including either working under the prescription of a dentist or independently, and either exclusively treating children, or patients of any age. Therapists may work in government or private clinics, and are typically licensed to examine teeth, take radiographs, administer local anesthesia, restore teeth, administer vital pulp treatments such as pulpotomies, extraction of deciduous (primary) teeth, provide sealants, scaling and polishing, and apply topical fluoride.

== Oral health therapists ==
Training for dental hygienists and dental therapists was combined in Queensland, Australia in 1998 to create oral health therapists or OHTs. They are now also trained in New Zealand, Singapore, and Indonesia. Depending on local regulations, oral health therapists may work in consultation with dentists, or independently. And depending on regulations and training, may treat only children, or patients of any age. Duties usually include examining teeth and/or gingiva (gums), taking and interpreting intra and extra-oral radiographs, diagnosing dental caries (decay) and periodontal (gum) disease, restoring teeth (either deciduous (primary) or both deciduous and permanent), extraction of deciduous teeth, scaling or debridement to remove calculus, polishing to remove stain, applying fissure sealants and topical fluoride, patient education, and oral hygiene instruction. Although dental hygienists and dental therapists can be jointly-trained in the UK, the oral health therapy scope does not exist there.

== Dental technologists ==
Dental technologists or dental technicians are dental professionals who fabricate dental appliances: removable protheses including dentures and orthodontic retainers, and fixed restorative work such as crown and bridges for the dental operator to insert. Denturists or clinical dental technologists or technicians are dental technicians with postgraduate training who see patients to fabric and fit dentures.

== Orthodontic auxiliaries ==
Orthodontic auxiliaries are oral health professionals who work exclusively under the direction of an orthodontist or dentist providing orthodontic treatment. Under supervision they place and remove orthodontic brackets, wires, bands, and appliances on patients, as treatment-planned by the orthodontist or dentist, in order to improve efficiency.

== See also ==
- Dentistry
- Dental assistant
