= Registered dental nurse =

Type of medical worker in the UK

A registered dental nurse (RDN) in the United Kingdom works as part of a dental team in a variety of clinical and non-clinical settings.

Some dental nurses work in dental hospitals and the public dental services, general dental practices and the Armed Forces. The national NHS 111 telephone service also employ dental nurse advisors. Dental nurse advisors assess, triage and arrange urgent treatment for callers who have dental emergencies or associated dental problems out-of-hours; including weekends and public holidays.

From 30 July 2008, all qualified dental nurses in the United Kingdom have to be registered with the General Dental Council (GDC). "Grandparenting" arrangements were in place 2006–2008 to allow unqualified dental assistants to register on the basis of experience. They now hold the title Registered Dental Nurse on the Dental Care Professionals register of the General Dental Council.

== Qualifications and entry ==
Entry for dental nursing can be competitive; especially for the BSc / FdSc Dental Nursing degree. Preference may also be given to priority groups who are under represented in the profession, such as; male applicants, those from ethnic minorities and those who identify as part of the LGBTQ+ community. The most up-to-date recognised qualifications that lead to registering with the GDC are specified by the General Dental Council.

In the United Kingdom, several recognised bodies award qualifications for dental nursing. The pathway to becoming a registered dental nurse involves completing a dental nursing diploma accredited by one of these awarding bodies and registering with the General Dental Council (GDC).

=== Awarding Bodies ===
- National Examining Board for Dental Nurses (NEBDN): The NEBDN is prominent in providing a National Diploma in Dental Nursing, a qualification highly regarded across the UK.
- City & Guilds: Offers the Level 3 Diploma in Dental Nursing, designed to equip students with practical skills and theoretical knowledge necessary for dental nursing.

Dental hospitals and further education colleges run courses on a full-time and part-time basis. In the United Kingdom, the first BSc in Dental Nursing was offered by [[New College Lanarkshire]] in 2018.

A small proportion of student dental nurses start their career in a hospital. They will attend lectures, usually at a school of dental nursing several times a week. Their practical experience is gained from placements on specialists clinics within the hospital, before qualifying.

== Professional associations in the United Kingdom ==
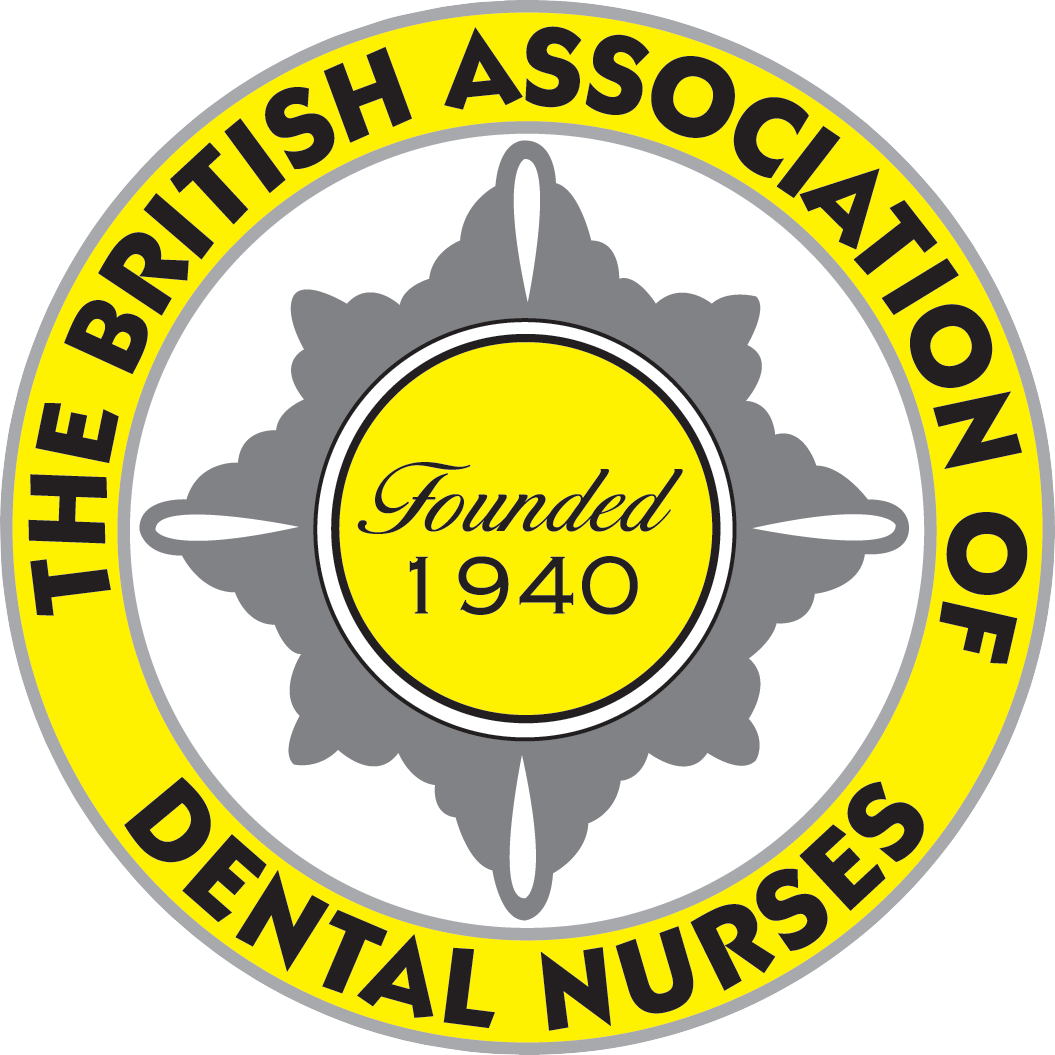

The British Association of Dental Nurses is the professional organisation representing dental nurses in the United Kingdom – whether qualified or unqualified, working in general practice, hospital, community, the armed forces, industry, practice management or reception. This association supports dental nurses themselves and represents the interests of dental nurses at all levels. The BADN Executive Committee is made up of dental nurses elected by the members.

The National Dental Nursing Conference, held each year, provides an opportunity for members of the dental team to meet with colleagues, socialise and further their professional education. The conference is held in a different location each year. Current BADN members receive a discount on conference registration fees.

BADN members in all categories have access to the digital quarterly journal The British Dental Nurses’ Journal. In addition, members have access to the legal helpline, as well as information and support, a members only area of the BADN website, and a range of discounts and special offers.

Full membership is available with or without indemnity cover. Student associate e-membership is also available to student dental nurses on or awaiting a place on a recognised course.

The Society for British Dental Nurses (SBDN) is another professional organisation representing dental nurses in the UK. Their sole purpose is to act on dental nurses’ best interests, and with their training and development.

== See also ==
- The British Association of Dental Nurses
- Dentistry
- Dental hygienist
- Dental technician
- National Examining Board for Dental Nurses (NEBDN)
