= Dental assistant =

Medical profession

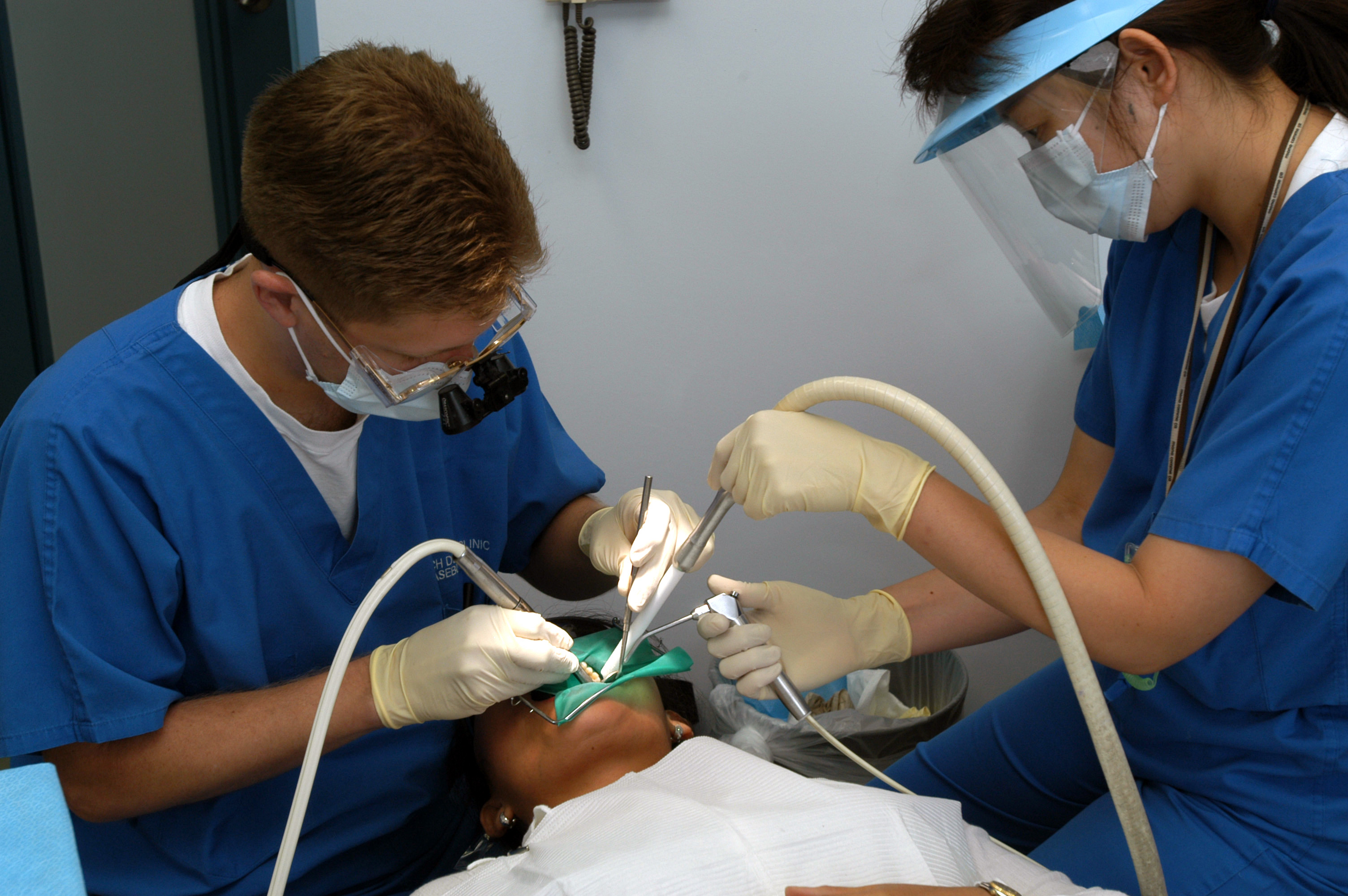
Dental assistant on the right supporting a dental operator on the left, during a procedure

Dental assistants are members of the dental team. They support a dental operator (such as a dentist or other treating dental auxiliary) in providing more efficient dental treatment. Dental assistants are distinguished from other groups of dental auxiliaries (such as dental therapists, dental hygienists and dental technicians) by differing training, roles and patient scopes.

== History ==
=== The first dental assistant ===
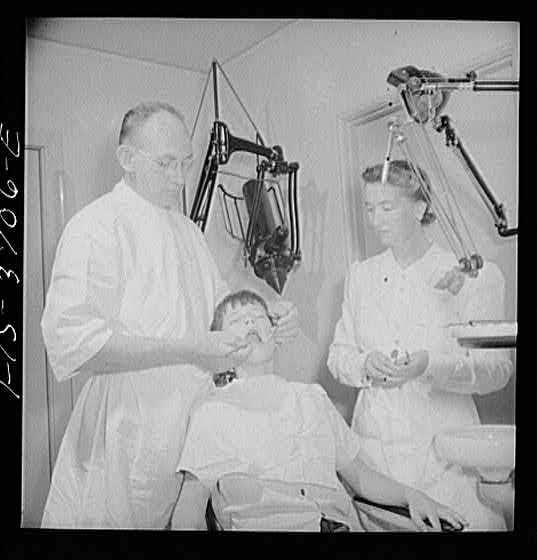
Infection control was very different in historical dentistry when compared to dentistry nowadays in 2018. Dental assistants and dentists did not wear all or if any personal protection equipment when practicing. We can see that the dentist, in this case on the left, is not wearing a mask, gloves or eye protection (apart from his glasses). Additionally, the dental assistant on the right, is also not wearing any gloves, mask or eye protection.

C. Edmund Kells, a pioneering dentist operating from New Orleans, enlisted the first dental assistant, Malvina Cueria. The dental field was initially dominated by males, but after this first addition of a female, it was then acceptable for women to seek dental treatment without their husbands. This led to dental assistants of that era also being known as "Ladies in Attendance". Thanks to the addition of women to dentistry, the profession flourished with more and more women seeking treatment and more patients overall receiving care.

=== The first association ===
It was not until almost four decades later that in 1923 the first dental assistant association was founded by Juliette Southard, named the American Dental Assistant Association and it is still in practice now. It began with just five members, now reaching more than 10,000.

== Roles ==
The dental assistant's role is often thought to be to support the dental operator by typically passing instruments during clinical procedures. However, in fact, their role extends much further to include: providing patients help with their oral hygiene skills, preparing the patient for treatment, sterilising instruments, assisting during general anaesthetic dental procedures, positioning suction devices, exposing dental radiographs, taking dental impressions, recording patient notes and administration roles such as scheduling appointments, ensuring compliance with OSHA and CDC standards, maintaining sterilization logs, and conducting regular operatory disinfection.

=== Infection control ===
It was customary for oral health care workers and dental assistants in the 1980s to practice oral health care without wearing gloves, masks or eye protection. This was at a crucial time due to the human immunodeficiency virus (HIV) spreading rapidly at a global rate. At the time, the transmission risks associated with bloodborne pathogens like HIV and hepatitis B were not fully understood, and personal protective equipment (PPE) was not yet standard in most clinical settings. However, the increased awareness and understanding of these infectious diseases by the late 1980s and early 1990s led to significant changes in infection control protocols across health care fields, including dentistry. However, in 2018 gloves, masks and eye protection have become part of the standard infection control guidelines which has been implemented in all oral health care settings as a means of preventing the spread of infectious disease. Infection control in oral health care not only protects the patient but it also protects the oral health care workers. This includes: dentists, dental specialists, oral health therapists, dental hygienists and dental assistants.

Dental assistants play a crucial role in maintaining high levels of infection control in the oral health care setting. Dental assistants are among the dental health care personnel responsible for following infection prevention practices to protect patients and staff. To perform infection control responsibilities well, the dental assistant must have the appropriate education, training and work experience. Examples of infection control protocols that the dental assistant needs to follow in an oral health setting include:

=== Hand hygiene ===
Hand hygiene aims to reduce the number of microorganisms on hands. Antimicrobial agents such as alcohol-based hand rub or antimicrobial soap and water are effective agents to remove most antimicrobial bacteria on hands in dental settings.

=== Personal protective equipment (PPE) ===
Gloves, gown, hair net and eye protection are essential barrier protection items that enable the dental assistant to reduce the transmission of infectious diseases to themselves, other dental co-workers and patients. Gloves and masks need to be disposed after each patient, eyewear can be disposable or reusable and gowns need to be replaced if visibly soiled. Lastly, footwear must include leather closed toe shoes; this minimises the risk of sharps injury.

=== Surgical procedures and aseptic technique ===
It is crucial to wear sterile gloves when the dental assistant is assisting in surgery with the oral health care clinician. Hand hygiene using antimicrobial soap and water is imperial to maintaining adequate infection control in this setting, as this minimises the risk of infection.

=== Management of sharps injury ===
It is crucial that sharp instruments which include: needles, scalers, scalpels, burs, orthodontics bands and endodontic files need to be handled with care and appropriate techniques to minimise any potential sharps injury. Sharps also need to be disposed accordingly into the sharps containers, separate from other disposable bins. The dental assistant needs to be aware of what is required to go into the sharps containers and what is not. This minimises the chance of spreading infectious diseases.

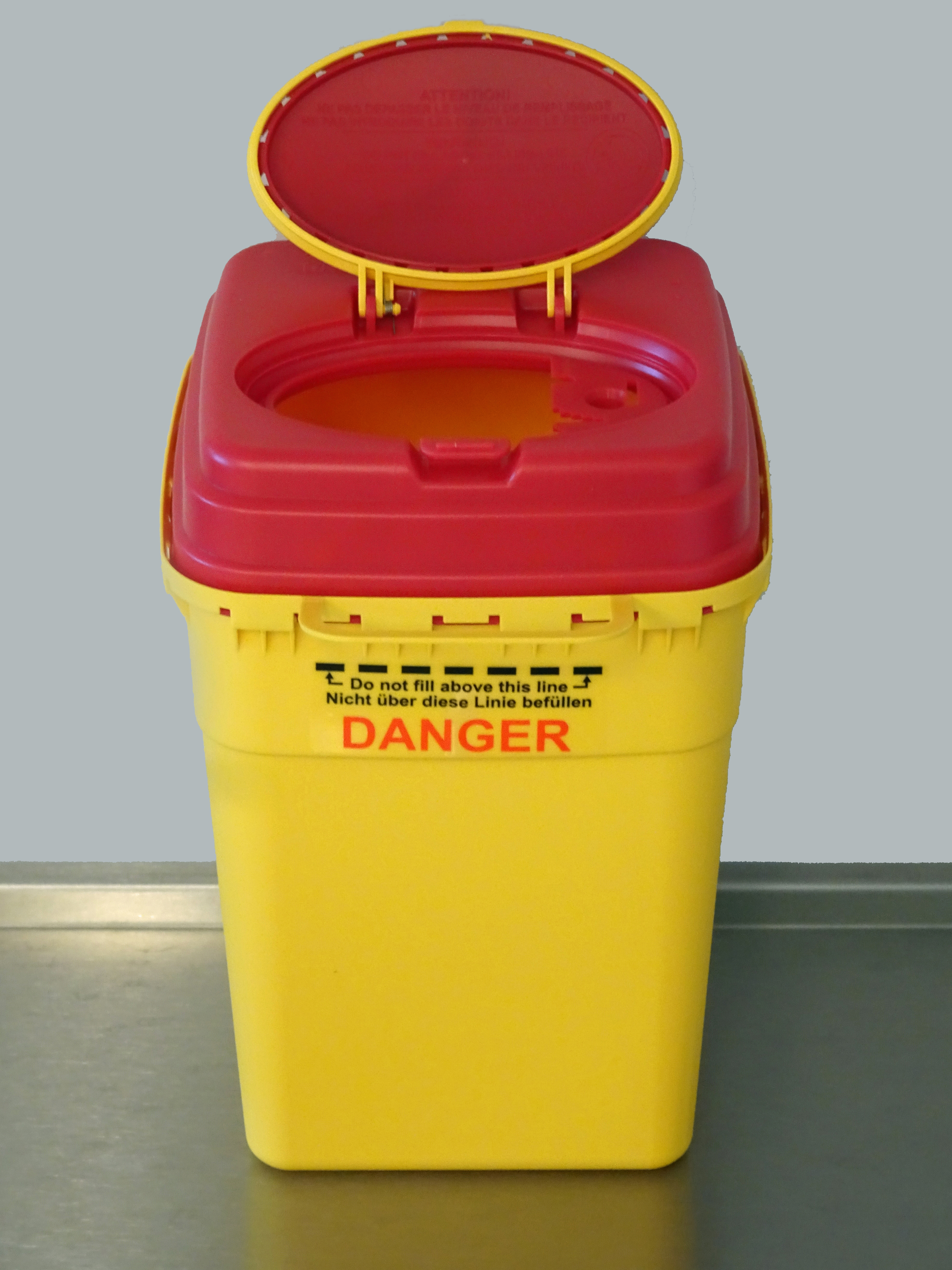
Container for medical sharps and infectious waste - typically found in dental surgeries

=== Management of clinical waste ===
It is imperative that when performing change over, that the dental assistant is able to distinguish the difference between medical related waste compared to contaminated waste. Contaminated waste needs to be placed in a leak proof thick yellow bag with a biohazard symbol label.

=== Environment ===
The dental assistant should put on utility gloves when cleaning working surfaces during the changeover between patients. Each person in the dental office needs to have his or her own pair/s of utility gloves. They must also be able to distinguish between clean and dirty zones as this minimises the spread of infectious diseases between co-workers and patients. Additionally, plastic barriers are placed on: instruments such as; hand pieces connected to the chair, overhead lights, amalgamators, x-ray machines, mixing materials and other miscellaneous dental instruments, materials or appliances. One of the roles that the dental assistant participates in is changing these plastic barriers after each patient has left that surgery. This ensures that the surgery is set up ready for the next patient.

- These infection control procedures and protocols not only apply to the dental assistant, but to all co-workers in the oral health care setting. However, the dental assistant is the major connection between the patient and the oral health care clinician. Therefore, it is imperative that they follow these guidelines to minimise the risk of spreading possible infectious diseases to co-workers, patients and themselves.

=== Sterilisation, disinfectant and antiseptic ===
Dental assistants play a large role in ensuring that the reusable dental instruments used daily in dental practices are sterilized adequately after each use. Sterilization is an essential part of the infection control protocol. This can be defined as free of all life forms where the elimination of considerable number of the most heat resistant spores (bacterial and mycotic) is the basic criteria sterilization. Sterilization process consists of

1. Autoclaving where moist heat kills bacteria by denaturation of high protein- containing bacteria at 250F (121 °C) for 15 to 20 minutes or 270 F for 3 minutes. Biological monitors and Process indicators are 2 methods used to ensure the effectiveness of sterilization process.
  1. Biological monitor (spore test) where bacterial spores are placed in strips or envelops along with the instruments. This method shows that the microorganisms have been eradicated and must be conducted weekly.
  2. Process indicators; where the load has reached a certain temperature, the indicators change their colour.
2. Dry heat sterilization which requires a higher temperature and longer time (1–2 hours) than steam autoclave, therefore, only glass or metal objects can be steamed by dry heat.
3. Chemiclave by using Ethylene oxide at relatively low temperature for 2–3 hours.
4. Cold/ chemical test which can be done by soaking instruments (heat- sensitive) in a specific chemical solution such as 2% glutaraldehyde for 10 hours in order to kill bacterial spores. However, this method does not destroy hepatitis viruses and spores.

Disinfectant is also one of the major roles of dental assistant where chemicals applied to inanimate surfaces such as lab tops, counter tops, headrests, light handles, etc. This is to make sure that germicide and/or microbiostatic are achieved. Antiseptic chemical agents similar to disinfectants but they may be applied safely to living tissue, is another task for dental assistant where Alcohol is the most commonly used.

=== Health promotion ===
Dental assistants make a difference in the community by participating in health promotion activities and programs. These programs may take place at schools, preschools, immunisation events or at maternal health clinics. Dental operators may also be supported by dental assistants during pre-school or school screenings.

Dental assistants can extend their scope to provide oral health promotion to patients in Australia by completing the Certificate IV in Dental Assisting (Oral Health Promotion). The dental assistant will have the ability to implement an individualised oral health promotion program and oral hygiene program. After the appropriate training the dental assistant may;

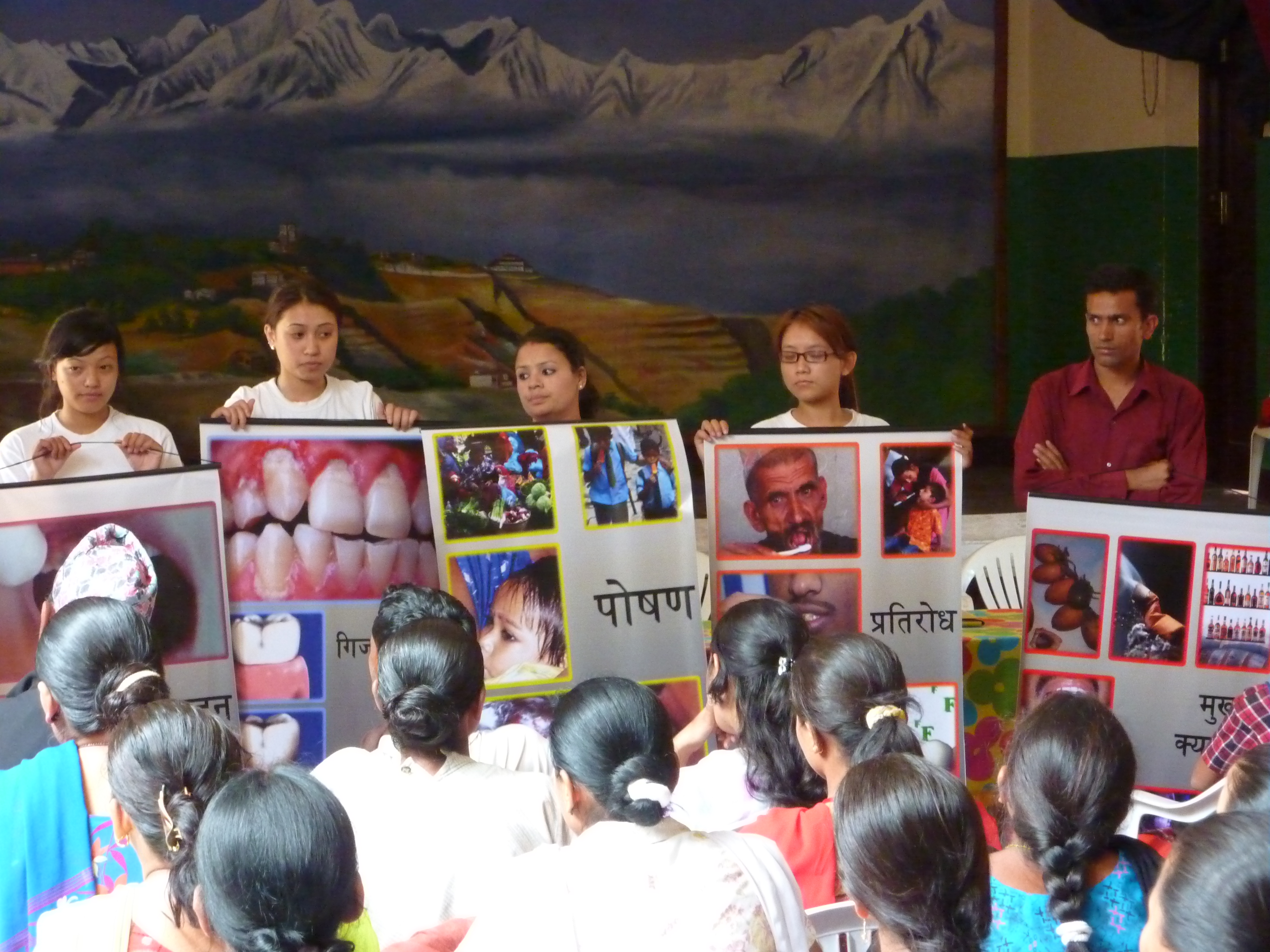
Health promotion for good oral health

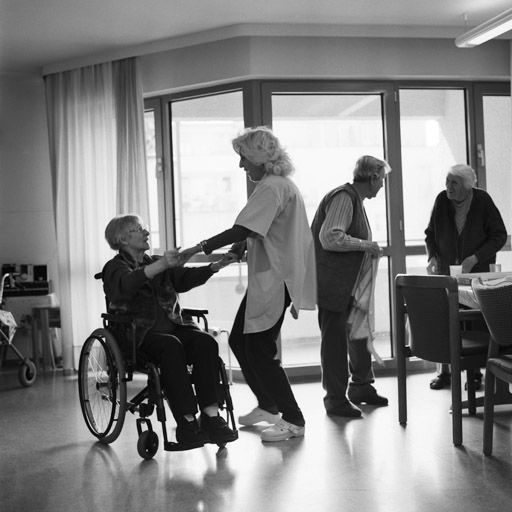
Residential aged care and dental assistants engaging in recreational activities - it is not always about teeth.

1. Promote the dental team concept in achieving good oral health and promoting good oral hygiene habits
2. Assist in making dental treatment accessible and affordable to the community
3. Perform health promotion activities by promoting good oral health to the community
4. Support and educate on oral health promotion to allied health professionals

Dental assistants help other dental and allied health professionals in health promotion. These dental assistants implement oral health programs by providing resources and presentation promoting oral health messages to several target groups and community settings. These settings include:

- Residential Aged Care Facilities
- Special Needs
- Schools
- Early childhood services
- Culturally diverse communities
- Community sport clubs

Dental assistant can educate the community and schools by advising on:

- Oral diseases
- Diet analysis and counselling
- Oral hygiene strategies
- Preventive strategies
- Care of fixed & removable prosthesis and fixed appliances
- Smoking cessation
- Preventing sports injuries

=== Radiography ===
Currently in Australia, dental assistants are not required to be registered under the Dental Board of Australia. However, dental assistants who have attained their certificate IV in dental assisting – Dental Radiography must hold a current license with the relative state or territory radiation authority. Dental assistants that decide to take on further study into their certificate IV in dental assisting - dental radiography, have an advantage of exposing patients to radiation also known as an x-ray, with regards to oral health care. The dental assistant will take training to further their practical and theoretical skills relevant to the role of the dental radiographer.

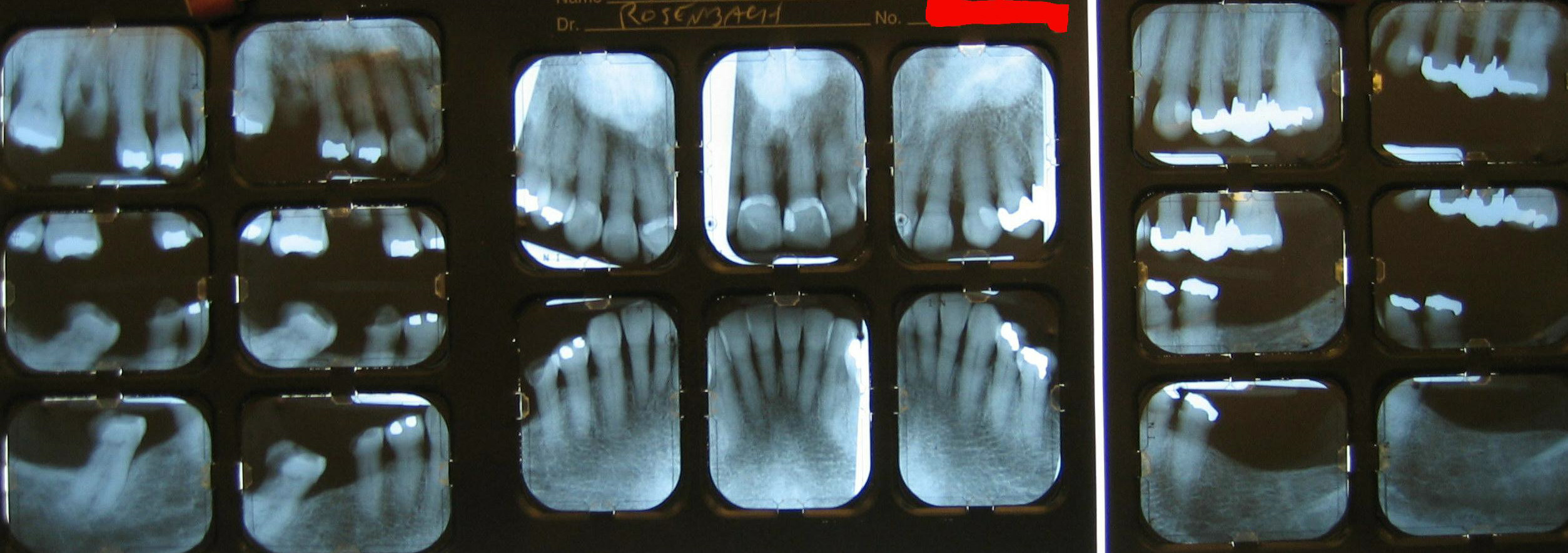
Dental radiography - pictures of intra oral radiographs of the whole mouth

Upon successful completion of the training program dependent on the course structure, the dental assistant may:

Expose intra-oral radiographs that ensures an optimum radiographic image.

- Process, mount and file intra-oral radiographs.
- Able to identify technical faults and their causes.
- Be able to demonstrate an understanding of potential hazards of exposure to radiation and to practice high standards of radiation therapy.
- To recognise normal anatomy.
- Maintain infection control throughout all practical procedures.

== Potential future roles ==
=== Ageing population ===
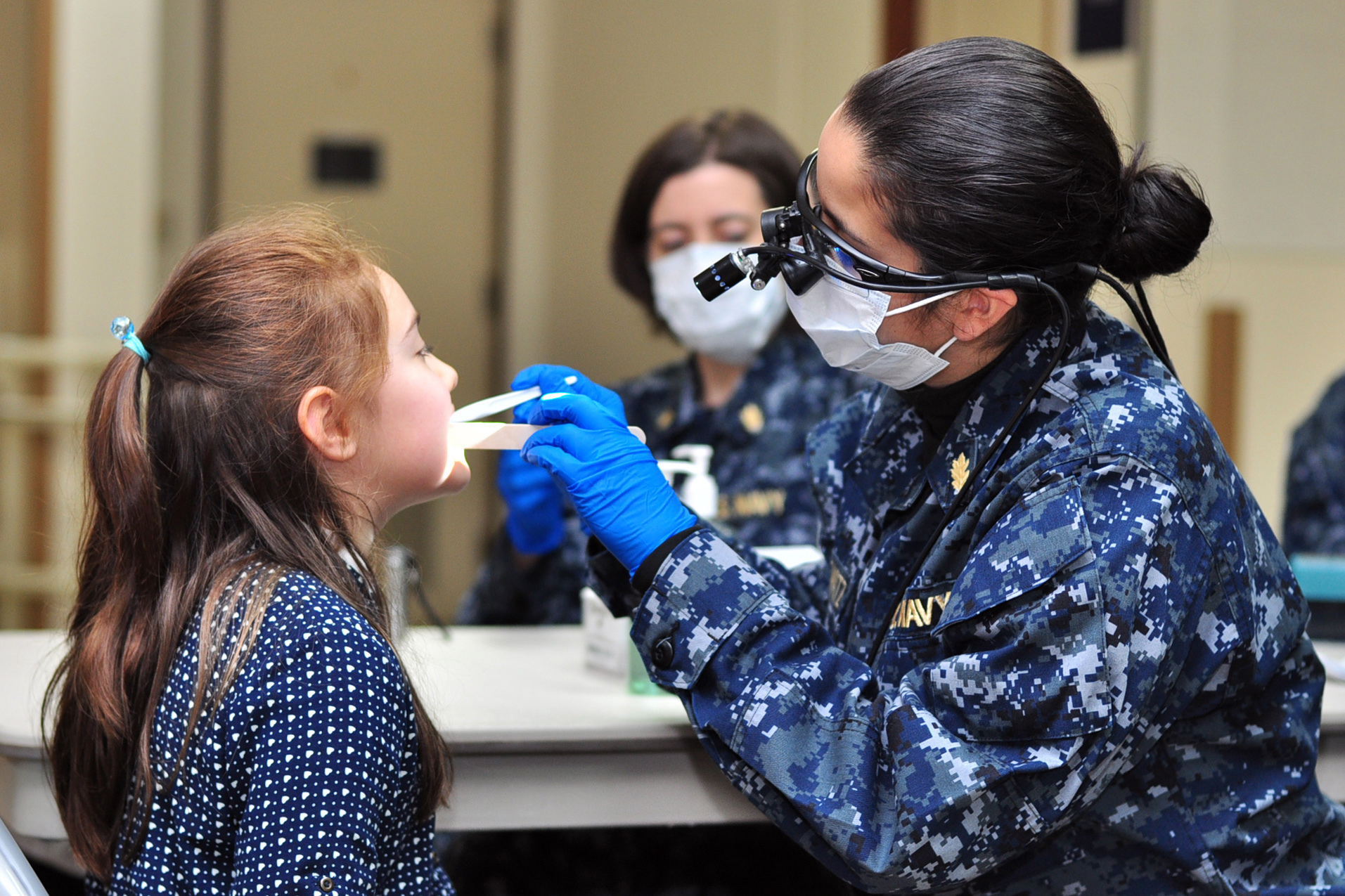
School screening where children are screened for dental decay or gum disease or other abnormalities of the mouth

Looking to the future of dentistry and oral health, the roles for dental assistants are ever-changing and expanding. With the increase in an ageing population, it will become more and more commonplace for dental assistants to be employed to support dental operators with providing oral health promotion and treatment within residential care facilities.

=== Increasing demand to match new dental graduates ===
The number of newly graduated dentists and dental auxiliaries is increasing and with that the need for dental assistants. According to the Bureau of Labor Statistics of America the rate of employed dental assistants will likely increase by 18% in the ten years between 2014 and 2024. With an increase in dental assistants comes the possibility of extension in the dental assistant roles and scope. As seen in some states of the United States of America, dental assistants are able to perform some simple fillings with the supervision of a practising dentist. By allowing dental assistants to extend their scope alongside the appropriate training, the workload of the other members of the dental team is lessened and increases efficiency of the dental clinic management. This may have the potential to reach other countries in the future as the need for dental and oral health treatments increase.

== Variations around the world ==
Dental assistant roles can vary depending on different country qualifications and regulations. Below are examples of dental assisting roles which the dental assistant is able to perform, respective to that country.

=== Australia ===
Australian flag - animated

According to the Australian Government, Department of Health, in 2006 there were 15,381 registered dental assistants supporting dental operators. Of those, 171 were Indigenous.

In Australia Dental Assistants should have the following skills:

- have excellent communication skills
- enjoy interacting with other people
- be organised and an efficient manager of their time
- be meticulous and pays great attention to detail
- possess good manual dexterity
- enjoy responsibility
- have the ability to comprehend and follow instructions
- be skilled at multitasking

Dental Assistants work as part of a wider dental team, primarily with Dentists, but also with Dental Specialists, Oral Health Therapists, Dental Therapists, Dental Technitions, Dental Hygienists and Dental Prosthetists.

Tasks include:

- receiving and preparing patients
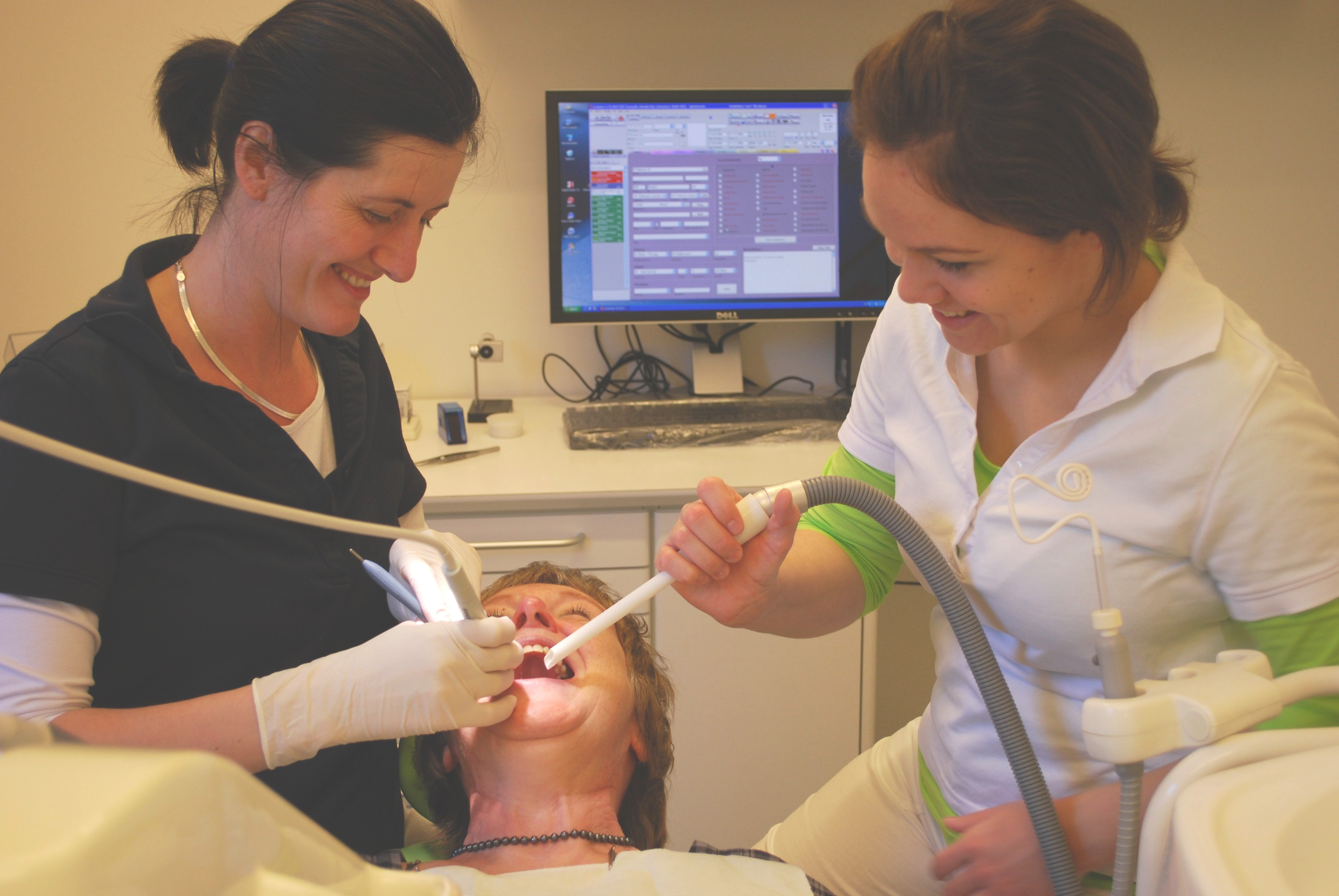
- Dental practitioner and dental assistant working in conjunction with one another
  arranging and handing instruments, medication, and other dental requisites to Dental Practitioners
- preparing dental materials and processing X-rays
- using suction devices and water sprays
- performing routine maintenance on equipment
- sterilising and preventing cross infection of equipment
- may advise patients on dental health education and post-operative care and procedures
- may act as receptionist for Dental Practitioners
- may perform billing and other clerical tasks

==== Education and licensing ====
1. No formal education is required (trainership)
2. Formal education and training (Certificate III and Certificate IV in Dental Assisting)
3. School based Traineeship for years 11 and 12 students

VICTORIA

Education Provider	Qualification	Course Type	Course Length (months)	Type
Bendigo Tafe	Certificate III Dental Assisting	Certificate III	12	Part Time
Bendigo Tafe	Certificate IV Dental Assisting	Certificate IV	12-18	Full Time
Bendigo Tafe	Certificate IV Dental Assisting	Certificate IV	18-24	Part Time
Box Hill Institute Tafe	Certificate III Dental Assisting	Certificate III	12	Full Time
Chisholm Tafe	Certificate III Dental Assisting	Certificate III	9	Part Time 1day/week
Chisholm Tafe	Certificate III Dental Assisting	Certificate III	5	Part Time 2day/week
GOTAFE Goulburn Ovens Institute of TAFE	Certificate III Dental Assisting	Certificate III	643 hours	Flexible
RMIT University	Certificate III Dental Assisting	Certificate III	12	Part Time
RMIT University	Certificate III Dental Assisting	Certificate III	12	Part Time
RMIT University	Certificate IV Dental Assisting	Certificate IV	12	Part Time 2-3day/month
Partners in Training (Private)	Certificate III Dental Assisting	Certificate III	12	Part Time
Partners in Training (Private)	Certificate IV Dental Assisting	Certificate IV	12	Part Time
Menzies Institute of Technology (Private)	Certificate III Dental Assisting	Certificate III	6 (for those with more than 12 months work experience	FullTime
Menzies Institute of Technology (Private)	Certificate III Dental Assisting	Certificate III	12 (for those with less than 12 months work experience	Traineeship
Menzies Institute of Technology (Private)	Certificate IV Dental Assisting	Certificate IV	6	Full Time

NEW SOUTH WALES

Education Provider	Qualification	Course Type	Course Length (months)	Type
North Coast TAFE Institute	Certificate III Dental Assisting	Certificate III	12	Part Time
North Coast TAFE Institute	Certificate IV Dental Assisting	Certificate IV	12	Part Time
Hunter Institute TAFE	Certificate III Dental Assisting	Certificate III	12	Part Time
Hunter Institute TAFE	Certificate IV Dental Assisting (Radiography)	Certificate IV	12	Part Time
Hunter Institute TAFE	Certificate IV Dental Assisting (Oral Health Promotion)	Certificate IV	12	Part Time
Illawarra Institute TAFE	Certificate III Dental Assisting	Certificate III	12-24	Part Time
Illawarra Institute TAFE	Certificate III Dental Assisting	Certificate III	12	Traineeship
Sydney Institute TAFE	Certificate III Dental Assisting	Certificate III	12-24	Part Time
Sydney Institute TAFE	Certificate III Dental Assisting	Certificate III	12	Traineeship
Western Sydney Institute TAFE	Certificate III Dental Assisting	Certificate III	12-24	Part Time
Western Sydney Institute TAFE	Certificate III Dental Assisting	Certificate III	12	Traineeship
Open Training & Education Network TAFE NSW	Certificate III Dental Assisting	Certificate III	12	Traineeship
Open Training & Education Network TAFE NSW	Certificate III Dental Assisting	Certificate III	12-24	Part Time
Open Training & Education Network TAFE NSW	Certificate IV Dental Assisting	Certificate IV	12	Traineeship
Open Training & Education Network TAFE NSW	Certificate IV Dental Assisting	Certificate IV	12-24	Part Time
Dental Assistants Professional Association	Certificate III Dental Assisting	Certificate III	12	Part Time
Dental Assistants Professional Association	Certificate III Dental Assisting	Certificate III	12	Traineeship
TrEd College	Certificate III Dental Assisting	Certificate III	6	Full Time

QUEENSLAND

Education Provider	Qualification	Course Type	Course Length (months)	Type
Queensland TAFE	Certificate III Dental Assisting	Certificate III	12	Part Time
Queensland TAFE	Certificate III Dental Assisting	Certificate III	12	Traineeship
ADA Queensland	Certificate III Dental Assisting	Certificate III	12	Part Time
ADA Queensland	Certificate IV Dental Assisting	Certificate IV	12	Full Time
Health Academy Australia (Queensland)	Certificate III Dental Assisting	Certificate III	12	Part Time

NORTHERN TERRITORY

Education Provider	Qualification	Course Type	Course Length (months)	Type
Department of Health (NT)	Certificate III Dental Assisting	Certificate III	12	Part Time
Department of Health (NT)	Certificate III Dental Assisting	Certificate III	12	Traineeship

WESTERN AUSTRALIA

Education Provider	Qualification	Course Type	Course Length (months)	Type
DNA Kingston Training	Certificate III Dental Assisting	Certificate III	12	Part Time
DNA Kingston Training	Certificate IV Dental Assisting	Certificate IV	12	Part Time
North Metropolitan TAFE	Certificate IV Dental Assisting	Certificate IV	12	Full Time
South Regional TAFE	Certificate III Dental Assisting	Certificate III	6	Full Time
South Regional TAFE	Certificate IV Dental Assisting	Certificate IV	6	Full Time
West Australian Institute of Further Studies	Certificate III Dental Assisting	Certificate III	12	Part Time
West Australian Institute of Further Studies	Certificate IV Dental Assisting	Certificate IV	12	Part Time

SOUTH AUSTRALIA

Education Provider	Qualification	Course Type	Course Length (months)	Type
TAFE SA	Certificate III Dental Assisting	Certificate III	6	Full Time
TAFE SA	Certificate III Dental Assisting	Certificate III	12	Part Time
TAFE SA	Certificate IV Dental Assisting	Certificate IV	12	Part Time

TASMANIA

Education Provider	Qualification	Course Type	Course Length (months)	Type
TASTAFE	Certificate III Dental Assisting	Certificate III	12	Traineeship

Australian Dental assistants perform limited and restricted duties and are not permitted to perform any of the following:

- any irreversible procedure on the human teeth or jaw or associated structures
- correcting malpositions of the human teeth or jaw or associated structures;
- fitting or intra-orally adjusting artificial teeth or corrective or restorative dental appliances for a person
- performing any irreversible procedure on, or the giving of any treatment or advice to, a person that is preparatory to or for the purpose of fitting, inserting, adjusting, fixing, constructing, repairing or renewing artificial dentures or a restorative dental appliance

Dental Assisting is not a registered profession in Australia and as such training courses are not mandatory, although those with nationally recognised qualifications will enjoy the benefits of higher wages and better employment opportunities.

There is no formal training required of entry level dental assistants in order to commence or undertake work in private practice in Australia. Most dental assistants gain practical experience at a place of employment although there are vocational qualifications which are nationally recognised and highly recommended for increasing a person's job prospects, remuneration, and professional development.

The National Vocational Qualification HLT35015 Certificate III in Dental Assisting is the entry level of vocational training for dental assisting while HLT45015 Certificate IV in Dental Assisting are suitable for those who seek to further their skills and duties and elect units from particular streams such as dental radiography, oral health promotion, practice administration, general anaesthesia and conscious sedation. These formal qualifications can be offered only by registered training organisations such as TAFE and professional associations while Certificate III in Dental Assisting may also be offered as a traineeship in most States of Australia and as a School-based Traineeship for years 11 and 12 in some States.

Currently dental assistants are not required to be registered under the Dental Board of Australia or with any State and Territory Boards since dental assisting is not a registered profession. Dental Assistants who have attained a Certificate IV in Dental Assisting – Dental Radiography and are required to operate dental radiography apparatus as part of their job role, must hold a current license with the relevant state or territory Radiation Authority.

Dental assistants are strongly encouraged to have current vaccinations for Hepatitis B, and Tetanus along with the normal childhood vaccination recommendations (Measles, mumps, varicella, polio) and influenza. Many state and territory public health care facilities and training providers will require students and workers to present evidence of Hepatitis B immunity and the results of a criminal history check prior to commencing clinical placement. Most private dental clinics will also require employees to have current vaccination records and may also require workers to undertake annual influenza vaccinations.

=== United States ===
Flag of the United States

According to Occupational Employment Statistics, in the USA in 2017 there are a total of 337,160 Dental Assistants: they all should have the following personal qualities:

- demonstrate sensitivity to the patient's needs
- show empathy
- "say the right thing at the right time"
- be sincere
- be a good listener
- be trust worthy

Unlike Australia, in the USA dental assisting is a registered profession represented by the American Dental Assistants Association (ADAA) and members should possess both front desk and chairside skills.

Routine duties include:

- Ensure that patients are comfortable in the dental chair
- Prepare patients and the work area for treatments and procedures
- Sterilize dental instruments
- Hand instruments to dentists during procedures
- Dry patients' mouths using suction hoses and other equipment
- Instruct patients in proper oral hygiene
- Process x rays and complete lab tasks, under the direction of a dentist
- Keep records of dental treatments
- Schedule patient appointments
- Work with patients on billing and payment

Extended duties may include:

- Coronal polishing
- Sealant application
- Fluoride application
- Topical anesthetic application

==== Education and licensing ====
In some U.S. states, dental assistants can work in the field without a college degree, while in other states, dental assistants must be licensed or registered.

Dental assistants can receive formal education through academic programs at community colleges, vocational schools, career colleges, technical institutes, universities and dental schools with most programs needing only 8 to 11 months to complete.

The Commission on Dental Accreditation of the American Dental Association accredits dental assisting school programs, of which there are over 200 in the United States.

To become a Certified Dental Assistant, or CDA, dental assistants must take the DANB (Dental Assisting National Board) CDA examination after they have completed an accredited dental assisting program, while those who have been trained on the job or have graduated from non-accredited programs are eligible to take the national certification examination after they have completed two years of full-time work experience as dental assistants. Some dentists are willing to pay a dental assistant-in-training that has a good attitude and work ethic.

In the USA the Dental Assisting National Board offers three nationally recognised certifications, namely:

1. Certified Dental Assistant (CDA)
2. Certified Orthodontic Assistant (COA)
3. Certified Preventative Functions Dental Assistant (CPFDA)

Expanded duties dental assistants or expanded functions dental assistants, as they are known in some states, may work one on one with the patient performing restorations after the doctor has removed decay Ideally, a dental assistant should have both administrative and clinical skills although it's still acceptable to have one or the other.

Duties may also include seating and preparing the patient, charting, mixing dental materials, providing patient education and post-operative instructions. They also keep track with inventory control and ordering supplies.

=== United Kingdom ===
Flag of the United Kingdom (3-5)

In the UK, Registered Dental Nurses are prohibited from carrying out any form of direct dental treatment on the patient, including teeth whitening procedures, under the GDC scope of practice. Dental nurses found to be carrying out dental procedures are liable to be removed from the statutory GDC register.

Duties include:

- taking responsibility for the decontamination of instruments
- maintaining dental operating equipment
- ensuring that all relevant materials and supplies are in place
- looking after patient records – including making notes when the dentist is examining a patient
- working closely with the dentist, responding quickly to requests and generally keeping the surgery ready for use

Those with additional training or skills developed during their careers can undertake expanded duties that may include:

- providing oral health education and health promotion
- assisting in the treatment of patients under conscious sedation
- assisting in the treatment of patients with special needs
- intra-oral photography
- shade taking
- placing rubber dam
- measuring and recording plaque indices
- pouring, casting and trimming study models
- removing sutures after the wound has been checked by a clinician
- apply fluoride varnish as part of programme that is overseen by a consultant or specialist in a public dental health setting
- constructing occlusal registration rims and special trays
- repairing acrylic components of removable appliances
- tracing cephalograms

Entry level working as a trainee dental nurse does not require any qualification, but progression to qualified dental nurse requires completion of a formal course of study, either part or full-time, approved by the General Dental Council. A minimum 2 GCSEs (C grade or above) in English language and maths or a science subject are usually required for part-time courses while full-time courses may require evidence of A-level or AS-level study. A level 3 apprenticeship in dental nursing is an alternative pathway to gaining the required qualifications in dental nursing.

=== Ireland ===
Flag of Ireland

In Ireland dental assistants have the following tasks:

- infection control
- chair-side assistance
- preparation and maintenance of the dental surgery
- patient care
- and administration of the dental surgery

Skills Required

- communication and organisation skills
- the ability to use initiative
- good manual dexterity
- and be prepared to work closely providing support & assistance during the provision of dental treatment

In the Republic of Ireland, it is often dental nurses (and teeth whitening technicians) who carry out teeth whitening procedures rather than dentists.

This practice mainly occurs in clinics focusing solely on laser teeth whitening. In Ireland, registration as a dental nurse with The Irish Dental Council is voluntary; however, nurses who are registered and who carry out teeth whitening may face disciplinary action if caught.

== Notable dental assistants ==
- Marie Foster
- Lesley Langley
- Sue Wilding

== See also ==
- Dentistry
- Dental auxiliary
  - Dental therapist
  - Dental hygienist
  - Dental technician
- Registered dental nurse
